= Terahertz metamaterial =

A terahertz metamaterial is a class of composite metamaterials designed to interact at terahertz (THz) frequencies. The terahertz frequency range used in materials research is usually defined as 0.1 to 10 THz. (Note: This corresponds to wavelengths below the millimeter range, specifically between 3 millimeters (EHF band) and .03 millimeters; the long-wavelength edge of far-infrared light.)

This bandwidth is also known as the terahertz gap because it is noticeably underutilized. (Note: The terahertz gap is the set of frequencies in the terahertz region (bandwidth) where unavailable materials have hindered construction of components and systems that might otherwise be universally available.) This is because terahertz waves are electromagnetic waves with frequencies higher than microwaves but lower than infrared radiation and visible light. These characteristics mean that it is difficult to influence terahertz radiation with conventional electronic components and devices. Electronics technology controls the flow of electrons, and is well developed for microwaves and radio frequencies. Likewise, the terahertz gap also borders optical or photonic wavelengths; the infrared, visible, and ultraviolet ranges (or spectrums), where well developed lens technologies also exist. However, the terahertz wavelength, or frequency range, appears to be useful for security screening, medical imaging, wireless communications systems, non-destructive evaluation, and chemical identification, as well as submillimeter astronomy. Finally, as a non-ionizing radiation it does not have the risks inherent in X-ray screening.

== About metamaterials ==
Terahertz waves lie at the far end of the infrared band, just before the start of the microwave band.

Currently, a fundamental lack in naturally occurring materials that allow for the desired electromagnetic response has led to constructing new artificial composite materials, termed metamaterials. The metamaterials are based on a lattice structure which mimics crystal structures. However, the lattice structure of this new material consists of rudimentary elements much larger than atoms or single molecules, but is an artificial, rather than a naturally occurring structure. Yet, the interaction achieved is below the dimensions of the terahertz radiation wave. In addition, the desired results are based on the resonant frequency of fabricated fundamental elements. The appeal and usefulness is derived from a resonant response that can be tailored for specific applications, and can be controlled electrically or optically. Or the response can be as a passive material.

The development of electromagnetic, artificial-lattice structured materials, termed metamaterials, has led to the realization of phenomena that cannot be obtained with natural materials. This is observed, for example, with a natural glass lens, which interacts with light (the electromagnetic wave) in a way that appears to be one-handed, while light is delivered in a two-handed manner. In other words, light consists of an electric field and magnetic field. The interaction of a conventional lens, or other natural materials, with light is heavily dominated by the interaction with the electric field (one-handed). The magnetic interaction in lens material is essentially nil. This results in common optical limitations such as a diffraction barrier. Moreover, there is a fundamental lack of natural materials that strongly interact with light's magnetic field. Metamaterials, a synthetic composite structure, overcomes this limitation. In addition, the choice of interactions can be invented and re-invented during fabrication, within the laws of physics. Hence, the capabilities of interaction with the electromagnetic spectrum, which is light, are broadened.

== Terahertz technology ==
Terahertz frequencies, or submillimeter wavelengths, which exist between microwave frequencies and infrared wavelengths, are virtually unused in the commercial sector, primarily due are limits to propagating the terahertz band through the atmosphere. However, terahertz devices have been useful in scientific applications, such as remote sensing and spectroscopy.

== Terahertz metamaterial devices ==
Development of metamaterials has traversed the electromagnetic spectrum up to terahertz and infrared frequencies, but does not yet include the visible light spectrum. This is because, for example, it is easier to build a structure with larger fundamental elements that can control microwaves. The fundamental elements for terahertz and infrared frequencies have been progressively scaled to smaller sizes. In the future, visible light will require elements to be scaled even smaller, for capable control by metamaterials.

Along with the ability to now interact at terahertz frequencies is the need to build, deploy, and integrate THz metamaterial applications universally into society. This is because components and systems with terahertz capabilities will fill a technologically relevant void. Because no known natural materials are available that can accomplish this.

Research has begun with first, demonstrating the practical terahertz metamaterial. Moreover, since, many materials do not respond to THz radiation naturally, it is necessary then to build the electromagnetic devices which enable the construction of useful applied technologies operating within this range. These are devices such as directed light sources, lenses, switches, (Note: Switching: The controlling or routing of signals in circuits to execute logical or arithmetic operations or to transmit data between specific points in a network. Note: Switching may be performed by electronic, optical, or electromechanical devices. Source: from Federal Standard 1037C) modulators and sensors. This void also includes phase-shifting and beam-steering devices (Note: Beam steering: is changing the direction of the main lobe of a radiation pattern. Note: In radio systems, beam steering may be accomplished by switching antenna elements or by changing the relative phases of the radio frequency radiation driving the elements. In optical systems, beam steering may be accomplished by changing the refractive index of the medium through which the beam is transmitted or by the use of mirrors or lenses. Source: from Federal Standard 1037C) Real world applications in the THz band are still in infancy

Moderate progress has been achieved. Terahertz metamaterial devices have been demonstrated in the laboratory as tunable far-infrared filters, optical switching modulators, and metamaterial absorbers. The recent existence of a terahertz radiating source in general are THz quantum cascade lasers, optically pumped THz lasers, backward wave oscillators (BWO) and frequency multiplied sources. However, technologies to control and manipulate THz waves are lagging behind other frequency domains of the spectrum of light.

Furthermore, research into technologies which utilize THz frequencies show the capabilities for advanced sensing techniques. In areas where other wavelengths are limited, THz frequencies appear to fill the near future gap for advancements in security, public health, biomedicine, defense, communication, and quality control in manufacturing. This terahertz band has the distinction of being non-invasive and will therefore not disrupt or perturb the structure of the object being radiated. At the same time this frequency band demonstrates capabilities such as passing through and imaging the contents of a plastic container, penetrating a few millimeters of human skin tissue without ill effects, passing through clothing to detect hidden objects on personnel, and the detection of chemical and biological agents as novel approaches for counter-terrorism. Terahertz metamaterials, because they interact at the appropriate THz frequencies, seem to be one answer in developing materials which use THz radiation.

Researchers believe that artificial magnetic (paramagnetic) structures, or hybrid structures that combine natural and artificial magnetic materials, can play a key role in terahertz devices. Some THz metamaterial devices are compact cavities, adaptive optics and lenses, tunable mirrors, isolators, and converters.

== Challenges in this field ==
=== Generating THz electromagnetic radiation ===
Without available terahertz sources, other applications are held back. In contrast, semiconductor devices have become integrated into everyday living. This means that commercial and scientific applications for generating the appropriate frequency bands of light commensurate with the semiconductor application or device are in wide use. Visible and infrared lasers are at the core of information technology. Moreover, at the other end of the spectrum, microwave and radio-frequency emitters enable wireless communications.

However, applications for the terahertz regime, previously defined as the terahertz gap of 0.1 to 10 THz, is an impoverished regime by comparison. Sources for generating the required THz frequencies (or wavelength) exist, but other challenges hinder their usefulness. Terahertz laser devices are not compact and therefore lack portability and are not easily integrated into systems. In addition, low-power-consumption, solid state terahertz sources are lacking. Furthermore, the current devices also have one or more shortcomings of low power output, poor tuning abilities, and may require cryogenic liquids for operation (liquid helium). Additionally, this lack of appropriate sources hinders opportunities in spectroscopy, remote sensing, free space communications, and medical imaging.

Meanwhile, potential terahertz frequency applications are being researched globally. Two recently developed technologies, Terahertz time-domain spectroscopy and quantum cascade lasers could possibly be part of a multitude of development platforms worldwide. However, the devices and components necessary to effectively manipulate terahertz radiation require much more development beyond what has been accomplished to date (2012).

=== Magnetic field interaction ===
As briefly mentioned above, naturally occurring materials such as conventional lenses and glass prisms are unable to significantly interact with the magnetic field of light. The significant interaction (permittivity) occurs with the electric field. In natural materials, any useful magnetic interaction will taper off in the gigahertz range of frequencies. Compared to interaction with the electric field, the magnetic component is imperceptible when in terahertz, infrared, and visible light. So, a notable step occurred with the invention of a practical metamaterial at microwave frequencies, (Note: It was essentially a proof of principle demonstration, which was later commonly applied to the higher-frequency domain of terahertz and infrared. See negative index metamaterials.) because the rudimentary elements of metamaterials have demonstrated a coupling and inductive response to the magnetic component commensurate with the electric coupling and response. This demonstrated the occurrence of an artificial magnetism, (Note: See main article: Paramagnetism) and was later applied to terahertz and infrared electromagnetic wave (or light). In the terahertz and infrared domain, it is a response that has not been discovered in nature.

Moreover, because the metamaterial is artificially fabricated during each step and phase of construction, this gives ability to choose how light, or the terahertz electromagnetic wave, will travel through the material and be transmitted. This degree of choice is not possible with conventional materials. The control is also derived from electrical-magnetic coupling and response of rudimentary elements that are smaller than the length of the electromagnetic wave travelling through the assembled metamaterial.

Electromagnetic radiation, which includes light, carries energy and momentum that may be imparted to matter with which it interacts. The radiation and matter have a symbiotic relationship. Radiation does not simply act on a material, nor is it simply acted on upon by a given material; radiation interacts with matter.

The magnetic interaction, or induced coupling, of any material can be translated into permeability. The permeability of naturally occurring materials is a positive value. A unique ability of metamaterials is to achieve permeability values less than zero (or negative values), which are not accessible in nature. Negative permeability was first achieved at microwave frequencies with the first metamaterials. A few years later, negative permeability was demonstrated in the terahertz regime.

Materials which can couple magnetically are particularly rare at terahertz or optical frequencies.

Published research pertaining to some natural magnetic materials states that these materials do respond to frequencies above the microwave range, but the response is usually weak, and limited to a narrow band of frequencies. This reduces the possible useful terahertz devices. It was noted that the realization of magnetism at THz and higher frequencies will substantially affect terahertz optics and their applications.

This has to do with magnetic coupling at the atomic level. This drawback can be overcome by using metamaterials that mirror atomic magnetic coupling, on a scale of magnitudes larger than the atom.

== The first THz metamaterials ==
The first terahertz metamaterials able to achieve a desired magnetic response, which included negative values for permeability, were passive materials. Because of this, "tuning" was achieved by fabricating a new material, with slightly altered dimensions to create a new response. However, the notable advance, or practical achievement, is actually demonstrating the manipulation of terahertz radiation with metamaterials.

For the first demonstration, more than one metamaterial structure was fabricated. However, the demonstration showed a range of 0.6 to 1.8 terahertz. The results were believed to also show that the effect can be tuned throughout the terahertz frequency regime by scaling the dimensions of the structure. This was followed by a demonstrations at 6 THz, and 100 THz.

With the first demonstration, scaling of elements, and spacing, allowed for success with the terahertz range of frequencies. As with metamaterials in lower frequency ranges, these elements were non-magnetic materials, but were conducting elements. The design allows a resonance that occurs with the electric and magnetic components simultaneously. And notable is the strong magnetic response of these artificially constructed materials.

For the elements to respond at resonance, at specified frequencies, this is arranged by specifically designing the element. The elements are then placed in a repeating pattern, as is common for metamaterials. In this case, the now combined and arrayed elements, along with attention to spacing, comprise a flat, rectangular, (planar) structured metamaterial. Since it was designed to operate at terahertz frequencies, photolithography is used to etch the elements onto a substrate.

=== Magnetic responses and refractive index ===
Schematic setup of an ellipsometry experiment

The split-ring resonator (SRR) is a common metamaterial in use for a variety of experiments. Magnetic responses (permeability) at terahertz frequencies can be achieved with a structure composed of non-magnetic elements, such as copper-wire SRR, which demonstrate different responses centered around a resonant frequency. Split ring resonators show a capability for tuning across the terahertz regime. Furthermore, the repeating structure made up the constituent materials follows the same strategy of averaging the electromagnetic field as it manipulates and transmits the terahertz radiation This averaging technique is called an effective medium response.

Effective permeability μ-eff is boosted from the inductance of the rings and the capacitance occurs at the gaps of the split rings. In this terahertz experiment ellipsometry is applied, rather than waveguides. In other words, a light source in free space, emits a polarized beam of radiation which is then reflected off the sample (see images to theright). The emitted polarization is intended, and angle of polarization is known. A polarization change is reflected (off the sample material) is then measured. Information on the phase difference (if any) and the reflected polarization is considered.

The local magnetic field of the cell material can be understood as a magnetic response. Below resonance the local magnetic field increases This magnetic response stays in phase with the electric field. Because the SRR cell is actually a non-magnetic material, this local magnetic response is temporary and will retain magnetic characteristics only so long as there is an externally applied magnetic field. Thus the total magnetization will drop to zero when the applied field is removed. In addition, the local magnetic response is actually a fraction of the total magnetic field. This fraction is proportional to the field strength and this explains the linear dependency. Likewise there is an aggregate linear response over the whole material. This tends to mimic alignments and spins at the atomic level.

With increasing frequency that approaches resonance over time the induced currents in the looped wire can no longer keep up with the applied field and the local response begins to lag. Then as the frequency increases further the induced local field response lags further until it is completely out of phase with the excitation field. This results in a magnetic permeability that is falling below unity and includes values less than zero. The linear coupling between the induced local field and the fluctuating applied field is in contrast to the non-linear characteristics of ferromagnetism

Later, a magnetic response in these materials were demonstrated at 100 terahertz, and in the infrared regime. Proving the magnetic response was an important step towards later controlling the refractive index. Finally, negative index of refraction was achieved for terahertz wavelengths at 200 terahertz using layer pairs metallic nanorods in parallel. This work is also complemented by surface plasmon studies in the terahertz regime.

Work also continues with studies of applying external controls such as electronic switching and semiconductor structures to control transmission and reflection properties.

== Reconfigurable terahertz metamaterials ==
Electromagnetic metamaterials show promise to fill the Terahertz gap (0.1 – 10 THz). The terahertz gap is caused by two general shortfalls. First, almost no naturally occurring materials are available for applications which would utilize terahertz frequency sources. Second is the inability to translate the successes with EM metamaterials in the microwave and optical domain, to the terahertz domain.

Moreover, the majority of research has focused on the passive properties of artificial periodic THz transmission, as determined by the patterning of the metamaterial elements e.g., the effects of the size and shape of inclusions, metal film thickness, hole geometry, periodicity, etc. It has been shown that the resonance can also be affected by depositing a dielectric layer on the metal hole arrays and by doping a semiconductor substrate, both of which result in significant shifting of the resonance frequency. However, little work has focused on the "active" manipulation of the extraordinary optical transmission though it is essential to realize many applications.

Answering this need, there are proposals for "active metamaterials" which can proactively control the proportion of transmission and reflection components of the source (EM) radiation. Strategies include illuminating the structure with laser light, varying an external static magnetic field where the current does not vary, and by using an external bias voltage supply (semiconductor controlled). These methods lead to the possibilities of high-sensitive spectroscopy, higher power terahertz generation, short-range secure THz communication, an even more sensitive detection through terahertz capabilities. Furthermore, these include the development of techniques for, more sensitive terahertz detection, and more effective control and manipulation of terahertz waves.

== Employing MEM technology ==
By combining metamaterial elements – specifically, split ring resonators – with Microelectromechanical systems technology – has enabled the creation of non-planar flexible composites and micromechanically active structures where the orientation of the electromagnetically resonant elements can be precisely controlled with respect to the incident field.

== Dynamic electric and magnetic metamaterial response at THz frequencies ==
The theory, simulation, and demonstration of a dynamic response of metamaterial parameters were shown for the first time with a planar array of split ring resonators (SRRs).

== Survey of terahertz metamaterial devices ==
Terahertz metamaterials are making possible the study of novel devices.

=== Novel amplifier designs ===
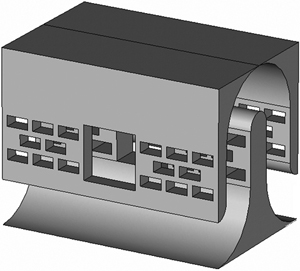
Section of a terahertz, folded-waveguide traveling-wave tube circuit with hole arrays on walls. Image from NASA Glenn Research Center.

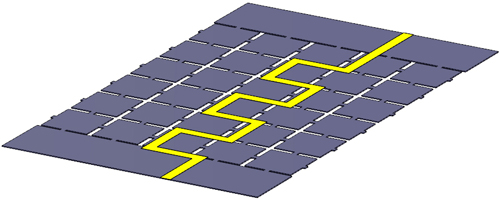
Terahertz planar traveling-wave tube circuit with metamaterial embedded in substrate. Image from NASA Glenn Research Center.

In the terahertz compact moderate power amplifiers are not available. This results in a region that is underutilized, and the lack of novel amplifiers can be directly attributed as one of the causes.

Research work has involved investigating, creating, and designing light-weight slow-wave vacuum electronics devices based on traveling wave tube amplifiers. These are designs that involve folded waveguide, slow-wave circuits, in which the terahertz wave meanders through a serpentine path while interacting with a linear electron beam. Designs of folded-waveguide traveling-wave tubes are at frequencies of 670, 850, and 1030 GHz. In order to ameliorate the power limitations due to small dimensions and high attenuation, novel planar circuit designs are also being investigated.

In-house work at the NASA Glenn Research Center has investigated the use of metamaterials—engineered materials with unique electromagnetic properties to increase the power and efficiency of terahertz amplification in two types of vacuum electronics slow wave circuits. The first type of circuit has a folded waveguide geometry in which anisotropic dielectrics and holey metamaterials are which consist of arrays of subwavelength holes (see image to the right).

The second type of circuit has a planar geometry with a meander transmission line to carry the electromagnetic wave and a metamaterial structure embedded in the substrate. Computational results are more promising with this circuit. Preliminary results suggest that the metamaterial structure is effective in decreasing the electric field magnitude in the substrate and increasing the magnitude in the region above the meander line, where it can interact with an electron sheet beam. In addition, the planar circuit is less difficult to fabricate and can enable a higher current. More work is needed to investigate other planar geometries, optimize the electric-field/electron-beam interaction, and design focusing magnet geometries for the sheet beam.

=== Novel terahertz sensors and phase modulators ===
The possibility of controlling radiations in the terahertz regime is leading to analysis of designs for sensing devices, and phase modulators. Devices that can apply this radiation would be particularly useful. Various strategies are analyzed or tested for tuning metamaterials that may function as sensors. Likewise linear phase shift can be accomplished by using control devices. It also necessary to have sensors that can detect certain battlefield hazards.

== See also ==
- Metamaterial cloaking
- Metamaterial antennas
- Nonlinear metamaterials
- Photonic crystal
- Seismic metamaterials
- Acoustic metamaterials
- Plasmonic metamaterials
- Spoof surface plasmon
- Transformation optics
- Theories of cloaking
- Metamaterials (journal)
- Metamaterials Handbook
- Metamaterials: Physics and Engineering Explorations

== General references ==
- Withayachumnankul, Withawat; D. Abbott (2009-07-29). "Metamaterials in the Terahertz Regime" (Free PDF download). IEEE Photonics Journal. 1 (2): 91. Bibcode:2009IPhoJ...1...99W. doi:10.1109/JPHOT.2009.2026288. S2CID 35360749.
- Moser HO, et al. (2005-02-15). "Terahertz Response of a Microfabricated Rod–Split-Ring-Resonator Electromagnetic Metamaterial". Physical Review Letters. 94 (6) 063901. Bibcode:2005PhRvL..94f3901M. doi:10.1103/PhysRevLett.94.063901. PMID 15783730.
- Federal Standard 1037C "b" to "byte"
- Federal Standard 1037C Glossary of Telecommunication Terms
- Military Acronyms, Initialisms, and Abbreviations
- Jany, S. J. Glossary of Laser Terminology. (PDF download). The American Board of Laser Surgery.
