= Nonlinear metamaterial =

A nonlinear metamaterial is an artificially constructed material that can exhibit properties not yet found in nature. Its response to electromagnetic radiation can be characterized by its permittivity and material permeability. The product of the permittivity and permeability results in the refractive index. Unlike natural materials, nonlinear metamaterials can produce a negative refractive index. These can also produce a more pronounced nonlinear response than naturally occurring materials.

Nonlinear metamaterials are a periodic, nonlinear, transmission medium. These are a type of negative index metamaterial where the nonlinearity is available because the microscopic electric field of the inclusions can be larger than the macroscopic electric field of the electromagnetic (EM) source. This then becomes a useful tool which allows for enhancing the nonlinear behavior of the metamaterial. A dominant nonlinear response, however, can be derived from the hysteresis-type dependence of the material's magnetic permeability on the magnetic component of the incident electromagnetic wave (light) propagating through the material. Furthermore, the hysteresis-type dependence of the magnetic permeability on the field intensity allows changing the material from left to right-handed and back.

Nonlinear media are essential for nonlinear optics. However most optical materials have a relatively weak nonlinear response, meaning that their properties only change by a small amount for large changes in intensity of the electromagnetic field. Nonlinear metamaterials can overcome this limitation, since the local fields of the resonant structures can be much larger than the average value of the field - in this respect metamaterials are similar to other composite media, such e.g. as random metal-dielectric composites, including fractal clusters and semicoutinouos/percolation metal films, where the areas with enhanced local light fields - "hot spots" (Note: sometimes referred to as Shalaev's "hot spots": see e.g.) - produce giant linear and non-linear optical responses.

== Overview of metamaterials ==
Metamaterials are incarnations of materials first proposed by a Russian theorist, Victor Veselago in 1967.

Nonlinear metamaterials, a type of metamaterial, are being developed in order to manipulate electromagnetic radiation in new ways. Optical and electromagnetic properties of natural materials are often altered through chemistry. With metamaterials optical and electromagnetic properties can be engineered through the geometry of its unit cells. The unit cells are materials that are ordered in geometric arrangements with dimensions that are fractions of the wavelength of the radiated electromagnetic wave.

By having the freedom to alter effects by adjusting the configurations and sizes of the unit cells, control over permittivity and magnetic permeability can be achieved. These two parameters (or quantities) determine the propagation of electromagnetic waves in matter. Therefore, the achievable electromagnetic and optical effects can be extended.

Optical properties can be expanded beyond the capabilities of lenses, mirrors, and other conventional materials. One of the effects most studied is the negative index of refraction first proposed by Victor Veselago in 1967. Negative index materials, exhibit optical properties opposite to those of glass, air, and the other conventional materials. At the correct frequencies, the negative index materials refract electromagnetic waves in novel ways, to a zero index or negative index. Also, energy can propagate in the opposite direction which can result in compensation mechanisms, among other possibilities.

=== Interactions ===
Materials which scatter light or other electromagnetic waves create a general physical process where the different frequencies of light are forced to deviate from a straight trajectory. It is because, physically, the material is non-uniform at one, or more, or many places.

Furthermore, the optical sciences make predictions about the path of light traversing through a material. When light deviates from its predicted (reflected) path, this also is considered scattering. The split ring resonators which make up metamaterials are engineered to scatter light at resonance. Moreover, these resonant scattering elements are purposely designed at a uniform size throughout the material. This uniform size is much smaller than the wavelength of the frequency of light propagating through the material.

Since the repeating, scattering, resonant elements, which make up the engineered material are much smaller than the frequency of propagating light, metamaterials can now, also, be described in terms of macroscopic quantities. This description is simply another way to view metamaterials. And these are electric permittivity, ε and magnetic permeability, μ.

Hence, by designing the individual, geometrically shaped unit of the material, called a cell, as the right kind of composite, it becomes a material with macroscopic properties that do not occur in nature.

Of particular interest regarding nonlinear metamaterials, is the artificially induced macroscopic property known as negative refractive index. This effect is created by Negative index metamaterials (NIMs), which are employed for use as nonlinear metamaterials. In NIMs, nonlinear phenomena such as second-harmonic generation and parametric amplification can take on highly unusual characteristics. Namely, the fact that the wavevector and the Poynting vector of a wave propagating in a NIM are counter-directed alters the phase-matching conditions for the interacting waves, resulting in backward propagating waves as well as considerably changed Manley-Rowe relations and the distribution in space of the interacting fields' intensity.

== Non-linear properties of left-handed metamaterials ==
Previous studies of left-handed or negative index metamaterials were focused on the linear properties of the medium during wave propagation. In such cases, the view was that magnetic permeability and material permittivity are each not dependent on the intensity of the electromagnetic field. However, creating tunable structures requires knowledge of non-linear properties where the intensity of the electromagnetic field alters the permittivity, or permeability, or both, which in turn affects the range of transmission spectra or stop band spectra. Hence, the effective permeability is dependent on the macroscopic magnetic field intensity. As the field intensity is varied, switching between its positive and negative values can occur. Consequently, the material can switch from being left-handed to being right-handed, or vice versa.

A composite structure consisting of a square lattice of the periodic arrays of conducting wires and split-ring resonators, produces an enhanced magnetic response. Without the correct magnetic response, it is not possible to produce a left-handed material.

=== Tunable split-ring resonators for nonlinear negative-index metamaterials ===
Variable capacitance diodes are incorporated into the split-ring cell producing a dynamic tunable system.

=== Reconfigurable refractive index (infrared) ===
Source radiation of near infrared wavelengths are applied to a metamaterial system. The index of refraction can be reconfigured to exhibit negative values, zero, or positive values.

=== SRR microwave nonlinear tunable metamaterial ===
Fabrication and experimental studies of the properties of the first nonlinear tunable metamaterial were operating at microwave frequencies. Such a metamaterial was fabricated by modifying the properties of SRRs and introducing varactor diodes in each SRR element of the composite structure such that the whole structure becomes dynamically tunable by varying the amplitude of the propagating electromagnetic waves. In particular, the power dependent transmission of the left-handed and magnetic metamaterials at higher powers were demonstrated, as well as the generation of particular harmonics, as was theoretically suggested earlier.

==== SRR microwave nonlinear magnetic metamaterials ====
The fabrication and experimental studies of the properties of thenonlinear tunable magnetic metamaterial were operating at microwave frequencies. Varactor diodes are symmetrically introduced, which results in dynamic tunability for the whole structure. Since the magnetic component of the interaction determines the application, the power dependency is demonstrated. Nonlinearity-dependent enhancement or suppression of the transmission turns out to be dynamically tunable.

==== SRR microwave nonlinear electric metamaterials ====
A novel class of nonlinear metamaterials has been proposed and engineered to demonstrate a resonant electric response within microwave frequency ranges. These metamaterials incorporate varactor diodes as nonlinear components within each resonator. This design enables the manipulation of the frequency of the electric mode stop band by modulating the incident power levels. Importantly, this modulation does not impact the magnetic response characteristics of the metamaterial. These elements could be combined with the previously developed nonlinear magnetic metamaterials in order to create negative index media with a control over both electric and magnetic nonlinearities.

Nonlinear resonators are designed in a similar fashion. A strong nonlinear electric response is obtained.

=== Sub-diffraction limit for non-linear metamaterial lens ===
By covering a thin flat nonlinear lens on the sources, the sub-diffraction-limit observation can be achieved by measuring either the near-field distribution or the far-field radiation of the sources at the harmonic frequencies and calculating the IFT to obtain the sub-wavelength imaging. The higher order harmonics are used, the higher resolution is obtained.

=== Non-linear electric metamaterial ===
A new type of nonlinear metamaterial is designed, and analyzed with a dominant negative electric response. Introducing nonlinearity into the electric response makes it tunable while leaving the magnetic response unchanged. A nonlinear NIM containing tunable electric and magnetic elements, which can respond independently is possible.

=== EM field shielding by non-linear metamaterials ===
It is well known that over certain frequencies, typical metals can reflect electromagnetic (EM) fields and can thus be used as electromagnetic shielding materials. However, conventional linear LHMs cannot be used to shield electromagnetic fields. This is drastically modified when nonlinearity of the magnetic response is taken into account, creating a controllable shielding effect in LHMs, accompanied by a parametric reflection.

== Meta-dimer metamaterial ==
A meta-dimer is composed of two spatially separated SRRs, with the two SRRs identical in each unit cell. The proximity of the SRRs in the dimer results in relatively strong coupling between them. A metamaterial comprising a large number of such metadimers can be utilized as an actively tunable medium at optical wavelengths. If either or both of the SRRs in the meta-dimer become nonlinear, the metamaterial itself acquires nonlinear properties. This can allow for nonlinear behavior, such as tunability in real time. Stereometamaterials are also a type of meta-dimer.

== See also ==
- History of metamaterials
- Negative index metamaterials
- Superlens
- Metamaterial cloaking
- Photonic metamaterials
- Metamaterial antennas
- Photonic crystal
- Seismic metamaterials
- Split-ring resonator
- Acoustic metamaterials
- Metamaterial absorber
- Metamaterial
- Plasmonic metamaterials
- Terahertz metamaterials
- Tunable metamaterials
- Transformation optics
- Theories of cloaking

Academic journals

- Metamaterials (journal)

Metamaterials books

- Metamaterials Handbook
- Metamaterials: Physics and Engineering Explorations

Metamaterials scientists

- John Pendry
- David R. Smith
- Richard W. Ziolkowski
- Nader Engheta
- Ulf Leonhardt
- Vladimir Shalaev
