= Tunable metamaterial =

A tunable metamaterial is a metamaterial with a variable response to an incident electromagnetic (EM) wave. This includes remotely controlling how an incident EM wave interacts with a metamaterial. This translates into the capability to determine whether the EM wave is transmitted, reflected, or absorbed.

In general, the lattice structure of the tunable metamaterial is adjustable in real time, making it possible to reconfigure a metamaterial device during operation. It encompasses developments beyond the bandwidth limitations in negative refractive index materials by constructing various types of metamaterials. The ongoing research in this domain includes electromagnetic band gap metamaterials (EBGs, also known as photonic band gap metamaterials or PBGs), and negative refractive index materials (NIMs).

== Overview ==
Since natural materials exhibit very weak coupling through the magnetic component of the electromagnetic wave, artificial materials that exhibit a strong magnetic coupling are being researched and fabricated by photolithography processes. These artificial materials are known as metamaterials. The first of these were fabricated (in the lab) with an inherent, limited, response to only a narrow frequency band at any given time. Its main purpose was to practically demonstrate metamaterials. The resonant nature of metamaterials results in frequency dispersion and narrow bandwidth operation where the center frequency is fixed by the geometry and dimensions of the rudimentary elements comprising the metamaterial composite. These were followed by demonstrations of metamaterials that were tunable only by changing the shapes and/or positions of their components. These have been followed by metamaterials that are tunable in wider frequency ranges along with strategies for varying the frequencies of a single medium (metamaterial). This is in contrast to the fixed frequency metamaterial, which is determined by the imbued parameters during fabrication.

== Tuning strategies for split ring resonators ==
Metamaterial-based devices could come to include filters, modulators, amplifiers, transistors, and resonators, among others. The usefulness of such a device could be extended tremendously if the metamaterial’s response characteristics can be dynamically tuned. Control of the effective electromagnetic parameters of a metamaterial is possible through externally tunable components.

=== Single element control ===
Studies have examined the ability to control the response of individual particles using tunable devices such as varactor diodes, semiconductor materials, and barium strontium titanate (BST) thin films.

For example, in 2008, a repeating split-ring resonator (SRR) cell was fabricated with semiconductor material aligning the gaps. This initial step in metamaterial research expanded the spectral range of operation for a given, specific, metamaterial device. Also this opened the door for implementing new device concepts. The importance of incorporating the semiconductor material this way is noted because of the higher frequency ranges at which this metamaterial operates. It is suitable at terahertz (THz) and higher frequencies, where the entire metamaterial composite may have more than 10^{4} unit cells, along with bulk-vertical integration of the tuning elements. Strategies employed for tuning at lower frequencies would not be possible because of the number of unit cells involved.

A semiconductor material, such as silicon, is controlled by photoexcitation. This in turn controls, or alters, the effective size of the capacitor and tunes the capacitance. The whole structure is not just semiconductor material. This was termed a 'hybrid', because the semiconductor material was fused with dielectric material; a silicon-on-sapphire (SOS) wafer. Wafers were then stacked - fabricating a whole structure. A. Degiron et al., appear to have used a similar strategy in 2007.

=== Multi-element control ===
A multielement tunable magnetic medium structure using immersed SRRs in liquid crystals, achieved a 2% tunable range in 2007.

Barium strontium titanate-loaded SRRs comprising tunable metamaterial encapsulate all of the tunability within the SRR circuit.

== Tunable NIMs using ferrite material ==
Yttrium iron garnet (YIG) films allow for a continuously tunable negative permeability, which results in a tunable frequency range over the higher frequency side of the ferromagnetic resonance of the YIG. Complementary negative permittivity is achieved using a single periodic array of copper wires. Eight wires were spaced 1 mm (0.039 in) apart and a ferromagnetic film of a multi-layered YIG at 400 mm (16 in) thickness was placed in a K band waveguide. The YIG film was applied to both sides of a gadolinium gallium garnet substrate of 0.5 mm (0.020 in) thickness. Ferromagnetic resonance was induced when the external H magnetic field was applied along the X axis.

The external magnetic field was generated with an electromagnet. Pairs of E–H tuners were connected before and after the waveguide containing the NIM composite. The tunability was demonstrated from 18 to 23 GHz. Theoretical analysis, which followed, closely matched the experimental results.

An air gap was built into the structure between the array of copper wires and the YIG. This reduces coupling with the ferrite, YIG material. When negative permeability is achieved across a range of frequencies, the interaction of the ferrite with the wires in close proximity, reduces the net current flow in the wires. This is the same as moving toward positive permittivity. This would be an undesired result as the material would no longer be a NIM. The separation also reduces the effective loss of the dielectric, induced by the interaction of the wire's self-field with permeability. Furthermore, there are two sources of conduction in the copper wire. First, the electric field in a (microwave) waveguide creates a current in the wire. Second, any arbitrary magnetic field created by the ferrite when it moves into a perpendicular configuration induces a current. Additionally, at frequencies where 𝛍 is negative, the induced microwave magnetic field is opposite to the field excited in a TE10 mode of propagation in a waveguide. Hence, the induced current is opposite to the current resulting from the electric field in a waveguide.

=== Metamaterial phase shifter ===
In aerospace applications (for example) negative index metamaterials are likely candidates for tunable, compact and lightweight phase shift modules, because these metamaterials can handle the appropriate power levels, have strong optical dispersion characteristics, and are tunable in the microwave range.

The YIG negative index metamaterial is a composite which actually utilizes ferrite material. As a metamaterial, the ferrite produces a resonant, (real) magnetic permeability 𝛍′ that is large enough to be comparable to the conventional ferrite phase shifter. The advantage of using a ferrite NIM material for phase shifter application is that it allows use of a ferrite in the negative magnetic permeability region near the FMR (ferromagnetic resonance frequency) when is relatively high and still maintains low losses. Near the FMR frequency, the magnitude of 𝛍′ is larger than that at frequencies away from it. Assuming the loss factor to be about the same for the NIM and the conventional ferrite phase shifter, we would expect a much improved performance using the NIM composite, since the phase shifts would be significantly higher owing to higher differential 𝛍′.

== Liquid crystal tuning for metamaterials ==
=== Tuning plasmonic resonances in metamaterials with liquid crystals ===
Metamaterials containing metallic elements can support a wide range of plasmonic resonances. Introducing a liquid crystal layer into such structures enables control over the wavelength and amplitude of resonance peaks observed in transmittance or reflectance spectra. This tuning arises from reorienting the liquid crystal director, which modifies its dielectric permittivity tensor. Two main mechanisms are responsible: first, the sensitivity of plasmonic resonances to changes in the dielectric environment; and second, the influence of the liquid crystal on the polarization state of incident light before it interacts with the metallic components of the metastructure.

Liquid crystals are therefore widely investigated for the active tuning of various plasmonic resonances, including localized surface plasmon resonances and surface lattice resonances in periodic arrays of nanoparticles, Tamm plasmon resonances, and others.

=== Liquid crystal metamaterial tunable in the near-infrared ===
Tuning in the near infrared range is accomplished by adjusting the permittivity of an attached nematic liquid crystal. The liquid crystal material appears to be used as both a substrate and a jacket for a negative index metamaterial. The metamaterial can be tuned from negative index values, to zero index, to positive index values. In addition, negative index values can be increased or decreased by this method.

=== Tunability of wire-grid metamaterial immersed into nematic liquid crystal ===
Sub-wavelength metal arrays, essentially another form of metamaterial, usually operate in the microwave and optical frequencies. A liquid crystal is both transparent and anisotropic at those frequencies. In addition, a liquid crystal has the inherent properties to be both intrinsically tunable and provide tuning for the metal arrays. This method of tuning a type of metamaterial can be readily used as electrodes for applying switching voltages.

=== Tuning NIMs with liquid crystals ===
Areas of active research in optical materials are metamaterials that are capable of negative values for index of refraction (NIMs), and metamaterials that are capable of zero index of refraction (ZIMs). Complicated steps required to fabricate these nano-scale metamaterials have led to the desire for fabricated, tunable structures capable of the prescribed spectral ranges or resonances.

The most commonly applied scheme to achieve these effects is electro-optical tuning. Here the change in refractive index is proportional to either the applied electric field, or is proportional to the square modulus of the electric field. These are the Pockels effect and Kerr effect, respectively. However, to achieve these effects electrodes must be built-in during the fabrication process. This introduces problematic complexity into material formation techniques. Another alternative is to employ a nonlinear optical material as one of the constituents of this system, and depend on the optical field intensity to modify the refractive index, or magnetic parameters.

=== Liquid crystal tuning of silicon-on-ring-resonators ===
Ring resonators are optical devices designed to show resonance for specific wavelengths. In silicon-on-insulator layered structures, they can be very small, exhibit a high Q factor and have low losses that make them efficient wavelength-filters. The goal is to achieve a tunable refractive index over a larger bandwidth.

== Hybrid metamaterial composites ==
Metamaterials were originally researched as a passive response material. The passive response was and still is determined by the patterning of the metamaterial elements. In other words, the majority of research has focused on the passive properties of the novel transmission, e.g., the size and shape of the inclusions, the effects of metal film thickness, hole geometry, periodicity, with passive responses such as a negative electric response, negative index or gradient index etc. In addition, the resonant response can be significantly affected by depositing a dielectric layer on metal hole arrays and by doping a semiconductor substrate. The result is significant shifting of the resonance frequency. However, even these last two methods are part of the passive material research.

Electromagnetic metamaterials can be viewed as structured composites with patterned metallic subwavelength inclusions. As mesoscopic physical systems, these are built starting from the unit cell level. These unit cells are designed to yield prescribed electromagnetic properties. A characteristic of this type of metamaterial is that the individual components have a resonant (coupling) response to the electric, magnetic or both components of the electromagnetic radiation of the source. The EM metamaterial as an artificially designed transmission medium, has so far delivered desired responses at frequencies from the microwave through to the near visible.

The introduction of a natural semiconductor material within or as part of each metamaterial cell results in a new design flexibility. The incorporation, application, and location of semiconductor material is strategically planned so as to be strongly coupled at the resonance frequency of the metamaterial elements. The hybrid metamaterial composite is still a passive material. However, the coupling with the semiconductor material then allows for external stimulus and control of the hybrid system as a whole, which produces alterations in the passive metamaterial response. External excitation is produced in the form, for example, photoconductivity, nonlinearity, or gain in the semiconductor material.

== Tunable spectral range via electric field control ==
Terahertz (THz) metamaterials can show a tunable spectral range, where the magnetic permeability reaches negative values. These values were established both theoretically and experimentally. The demonstrated principle represents a step forward toward a metamaterial with negative refractive index capable of covering continuously a broad range of THz frequencies and opens a path for the active manipulation of millimeter and submillimeter beams.

== Frequency selective surface based metamaterials ==
Frequency selective surfaces (FSS), which allow tuning of frequency response, have become an alternative to fixed frequency metamaterials where static geometries and spacings of split-ring resonators determine the frequency response of a given metamaterial.

Frequency selective surfaces can be fabricated as planar 2-dimensional periodic arrays of metallic elements with specific shapes, or can be periodic aperture in a metallic screen. The transmission and reflection coefficients for these surfaces are dependent on the frequency of operation and may also depend on the polarization and the angle of the transmitted electromagnetic wave striking the material (angle of incidence). The versatility of these structures are shown when having frequency bands at which a given FSS is completely opaque (stopbands) and other bands at which the same surface allows wave transmission.

An example of where this alternative is highly advantageous is in outer space, such as satellites and telescopes in orbit. The expense of regular space missions to access a single piece of equipment for tuning and maintenance would be prohibitive.

FSS was first developed to control the transmission and reflection characteristics of an incident radiation wave. This has resulted in smaller split-ring resonator cell sizes along with increases in bandwidth and the capability to shift frequencies in real time for metamaterials.

This type of structure can be used to create a metamaterial surface with the intended application of artificial magnetic conductors or applications for boundary conditions. Another application is as stopband device for surface wave propagation along the interface. This is because surface waves are a created as a consequence of an interface between two media having dissimilar refractive indices. Depending on the application of the system that includes the two media, there may be a need to attenuate surface waves or utilize them.

An FSS based metamaterial employs a (miniature) model of equivalent LC circuitry. At low frequencies the physics of the interactions is essentially defined by the LC electromagnetic modeling and numerical simulation. This is also known as the static LC model. At higher frequencies the static LC concepts become unavailable. This is due to dependence on phasing. When the FSS is engineered for electromagnetic band-gap (EBG) characteristics, the FSS is designed to enlarge its stopband properties in relation to dispersion relations and surface wave (SW) frequencies (microwave and radio frequencies). Furthermore, as an EBG it is designed to reduce its dependence on the propagating direction of the surface wave traveling across the surface (interface).

=== Artificial magnetic conductors and high impedance surfaces ===
A type of FSS based metamaterial interchangably referred to as an Artificial Magnetic Conductor (AMC) or High Impedance Surface (HIS) is an artificial, metallic, electromagnetic structure. The structure is designed to be selective in supporting surface wave currents, differentiating it from conventional metallic conductors. It has applications for microwave circuits and antennas.

As an antenna ground plane it suppresses the wave propagation of surface waves. It is deployed as an improvement over the flat metal sheet as a ground plane or reflector. Hence, this strategy tends to improve the performance of the antenna.

Strong surface waves of sufficient strength which propagate on the metal ground plane will reach the edge and propagate into free space. This creates multi-path interference. In contrast the HIS surface suppresses the propagation of surface waves. Furthermore, control of the radio frequency or microwave radiation pattern is efficiently increased.

When employing conventional ground planes as the experimental control, the HIS surface exhibits a smoother radiation pattern, an increase in the gain of the main lobe, a decrease in undesirable return radiation, and a decrease in mutual coupling.

=== Description ===
An HIS, or AMC, can be described as a type of electromagnetic band gap (EBG) material or a type of synthetic composite that is intentionally structured with a magnetic conductor surface for an allotted, but defined range of frequencies. AMC, or HIS structures often emerge from an engineered periodic dielectric base along with metallization patterns designed for microwave and radio frequencies. The metalization pattern is usually determined by the intended application of the AMC or HIS structure. Furthermore, two inherent notable properties, which cannot be found in natural materials, have led to a significant number of microwave circuit applications.

First, AMC or HIS surfaces are designed to have an allotted set of frequencies over which electromagnetic surface waves and currents will not be allowed to propagate. These materials are then both beneficial and practical as antenna ground planes, small flat signal processing filters, or filters as part of waveguide structures. For example, AMC surfaces as antenna ground planes are able to effectively attenuate undesirable wave fluctuations, or undulations, while producing good radiation patterns. This is because the material can suppress surface wave propagation within the proscribed range of forbidden frequencies.

Second, AMC surfaces have very high surface impedance within a specific frequency range, where the tangential magnetic field is small, even with a large electric field along the surface. Therefore, an AMC surface can have a reflection coefficient of +1.

In addition, the reflection phase of incident light is part of the AMC and HIS tool box. (Note: When light goes from one medium (n-1) to another (n-2), the reflected light at that interface undergoes a phase change as follows: if n-1 < n-2 there is a 180 degree phase change. However, if n-1 > n-2: no phase change.) The phase of the reflected electric field has normal incidence the same phase of the electric field impinging at the interface of the reflecting surface. The variation of the reflection phase is continuous between +180° and −180° relative to the frequency. Zero is crossed at one frequency, where resonance occurs. A notable characteristic is that the useful bandwidth of an AMC is generally defined as +90° to −90° on either side of the central frequency. Thus, due to this unusual boundary condition, in contrast to the case of a conventional metal ground plane, an AMC surface can function as a new type of ground plane for low-profile wire antennas (wireless communication systems). For example, even though a horizontal wire antenna is extremely close to an AMC surface, the current on the antenna and its image current on the ground plane are in-phase, rather than out-of phase, thereby strengthening the radiation.

=== AMC as an FSS band gap ===
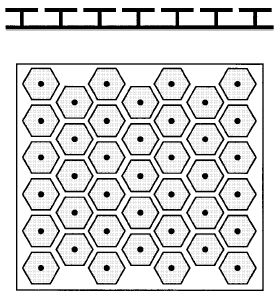
Simplified circuit board illustration. The side view is shown at top. The structure consists of a lattice of metal plates, connected to a solid metal sheet by vertical conducting vias. Looking down from above the high-impedance surface, showing a lattice of hexagonal metal plates. The configuration creates a capacitive and inductive surface. It can be utilized as a band gap material at specific proscribed frequencies. It is also designed to enhance antenna operation as a novel periodic material.

Frequency selective surfaces (FSS) materials can be utilized as band gap material in the surface wave domain, at microwave and radio frequency wavelengths. Support of surface waves is a given property of metals. These are propagating electromagnetic waves that are bound to the interface between the metal surface and the air. Surface plasmons occur at optical frequencies, but at microwave frequencies, they are the normal currents that occur on any electrical conductor. At radio frequencies, the fields associated with surface waves can extend thousands of wavelengths into the surrounding space, and they are often best described as surface currents. They can be modeled from the viewpoint of an effective dielectric constant, or an effective surface impedance.

For example, a flat metal sheet always has low surface impedance. However, by incorporating a special texture on a conducting surface with a specially designed geometry, it is possible to engineer a high surface impedance and alter its electromagnetic-radio-frequency properties. The protrusions are arranged in a two dimensional lattice structure, and can be visualized as thumbtacks protruding from the surface.

Because the protrusions are fractionally smaller than the operating wavelength, the structure can be described using an effective medium model, and the electromagnetic properties can be described using lumped-circuit elements (capacitors and inductors). They behave as a network of parallel resonant LC circuits, which act as a two-dimensional electric filter to block the flow of currents along the sheet.

This structure can then serve as an artificial magnetic conductor (AMC), because of its high surface impedance within a certain frequency range. In addition, as an artificial magnetic conductor it has a forbidden frequency band, over which surface waves and currents cannot propagate. Therefore, AMC surfaces have good radiation patterns without unwanted ripples based on suppressing the surface wave propagation within the band gap frequency range.

The surface impedance is derived from the ratio of the electric field at the surface to the magnetic field at the surface, which extends far into the metal beyond the skin depth. When a texture is applied to the metal surface, the surface impedance is altered, and its surface wave properties are changed. At low frequencies, it is inductive, and supports transverse-magnetic (TM) waves. At high frequencies, it is capacitive, and supports transverse electric (TE) waves. Near the LC resonance frequency, the surface impedance is very high. In this region, waves are not bound to the surface. Instead, they radiate into the surrounding space.

A high-impedance surface was fabricated as a printed circuit board. The structure consists of a triangular lattice of hexagonal metal plates, connected to a solid metal sheet by vertical conducting vias.

== Uniplanar compact photonic-bandgap ==
The Uniplanar Compact Photonic-BandGap (UC-PBG) is proposed, simulated, and then constructed in the lab to overcome limitations of planar circuit technology. Like photonic bandgap structures it is etched into the ground plane of the microstrip line. The geometry is square metal pads. Each metal pad has four connecting branches forming a distributed LC circuit.

== See also ==
- Negative index metamaterials
- History of metamaterials
- Metamaterial cloaking
- Photonic metamaterials
- Metamaterial
- Metamaterial antennas
- Nonlinear metamaterials
- Photonic crystal
- Seismic metamaterials
- Split-ring resonator
- Acoustic metamaterials
- Metamaterial absorber
- Plasmonic metamaterials
- Superlens
- Terahertz metamaterials
- Transformation optics
- Theories of cloaking
- Metamaterials (journal)
- Metamaterials Handbook
- Metamaterials: Physics and Engineering Explorations
