= Negative refraction =

Light wave refraction with opposite properties to those usually observed

In optics, negative refraction is the electromagnetic phenomenon where light rays become refracted at an interface that is opposite to their more commonly observed positive refractive properties. Negative refraction can be obtained by using a metamaterial which has been designed to achieve a negative value for electric permittivity (ε) and magnetic permeability (μ); in such cases the material can be assigned a negative refractive index. Such materials are sometimes called "double negative" materials.

Negative refraction occurs at interfaces between materials at which one has an ordinary positive phase velocity (i.e., a positive refractive index), and the other has the more exotic negative phase velocity (a negative refractive index).

== Negative phase velocity ==
Negative phase velocity (NPV) is a property of light propagation in a medium. There are different definitions of NPV; the most common is Victor Veselago's original proposal of opposition of the wave vector and (Abraham) the Poynting vector. Other definitions include the opposition of wave vector to group velocity, and energy to velocity. "Phase velocity" is used conventionally, as phase velocity has the same sign as the wave vector.

A typical criterion used to determine Veselago's NPV is that the dot product of the Poynting vector and wave vector is negative (i.e., that $\scriptstyle\vec{P}\cdot\vec{k}<0$), but this definition is not covariant. While this restriction is not practically significant, the criterion has been generalized into a covariant form. Veselago NPV media are also called "left-handed (meta)materials", as the components of plane waves passing through (electric field, magnetic field, and wave vector) follow the left-hand rule instead of the right-hand rule. The terms "left-handed" and "right-handed" are generally avoided as they are also used to refer to chiral media.

== Negative refractive index ==
A comparison of refraction in a left-handed metamaterial to that in a normal material

Video representing negative refraction of light at uniform planar interface.

One can choose to avoid directly considering the Poynting vector and wave vector of a propagating light field, and instead directly consider the response of the materials. Assuming the material is achiral, one can consider what values of permittivity (ε) and permeability (μ) result in negative phase velocity (NPV). Since both ε and μ are generally complex, their imaginary parts do not have to be negative for a passive (i.e. lossy) material to display negative refraction. In these materials, the criterion for negative phase velocity is derived by Depine and Lakhtakia to be

$$\epsilon_r|\mu|+ \mu_r |\epsilon| < 0,$$

where $\epsilon_r, \mu_r$ are the real valued parts of ε and μ, respectively. For active materials, the criterion is different.

NPV occurrence does not necessarily imply negative refraction (negative refractive index). Typically, the refractive index $n$ is determined using

$$n =\pm\sqrt{\epsilon\mu}$$,

where by convention the positive square root is chosen for $n$. However, in NPV materials, the negative square root is chosen to mimic the fact that the wave vector and phase velocity are also reversed. The refractive index is a derived quantity that describes how the wavevector is related to the optical frequency and propagation direction of the light; thus, the sign of $n$ must be chosen to match the physical situation.

=== In chiral materials ===
The refractive index $n$ also depends on the chirality parameter $\kappa$, resulting in distinct values for left and right circularly polarized waves, given by

$$n = \pm\sqrt{\epsilon_r\mu_r} \pm \kappa$$.

A negative refractive index occurs for one polarization if $\kappa$ > $\sqrt{\epsilon_r\mu_r}$; in this case, $\epsilon_r$ and/or $\mu_r$ do not need to be negative. A negative refractive index due to chirality was predicted by Pendry and Tretyakov et al., and first observed simultaneously and independently by Plum et al. and Zhang et al. in 2009.

== Refraction ==
The consequence of negative refraction is light rays are refracted on the same side of the normal on entering the material, as indicated in the diagram, and by a general form of Snell's law. When refraction occurs with no accompanying reflection it is termed total refraction.

== See also ==
- Acoustic metamaterials
- Metamaterial
- Negative index metamaterials
- Metamaterial antennas
- Multiple-prism dispersion theory
- N-slit interferometric equation
- Perfect lens
- Photonic metamaterials
- Photonic crystal
- Seismic metamaterials
- Split-ring resonator
- Tunable metamaterials

=== Electromagnetic interactions ===
- Bloch's theorem
- Casimir effect
- Dielectric
- Electromagnetism
- EM radiation
- Electron mobility
- Permeability (electromagnetism)
- Permittivity
- Wavenumber
- Photo-Dember
- Impedance
