= Theories of cloaking =

Theories of cloaking discusses various theories based on science and research, for producing an electromagnetic cloaking device. Theories presented employ transformation optics, event cloaking, dipolar scattering cancellation, tunneling light transmittance, sensors and active sources, and acoustic cloaking.

A cloaking device is one where the purpose of the transformation is to hide something, so that a defined region of space is invisibly isolated from passing electromagnetic fields (see Metamaterial cloaking) or sound waves. Objects in the defined location are still present, but incident waves are guided around them without being affected by the object itself. Along with this basic "cloaking device", other related concepts have been proposed in peer reviewed, scientific articles, and are discussed here. Naturally, some of the theories discussed here also employ metamaterials, either electromagnetic or acoustic, although often in a different manner than the original demonstration and its successor, the broad-band cloak.

== The first electromagnetic cloak ==
The first electromagnetic cloaking device was produced in 2006, using gradient-index metamaterials. This has led to the burgeoning field of transformation optics (and now transformation acoustics), where the propagation of waves is precisely manipulated by controlling the behaviour of the material through which the light (sound) is travelling.

== Ordinary spatial cloaking ==
Waves and the host material in which they propagate have a symbiotic relationship: both act on each other. A simple spatial cloak relies on fine tuning the properties of the propagation medium in order to direct the flow smoothly around an object, like water flowing past a rock in a stream, but without reflection, or without creating turbulence. Another analogy is that of a flow of cars passing a symmetrical traffic island – the cars are temporarily diverted, but can later reassemble themselves into a smooth flow that holds no information about whether the traffic island was small or large, or whether flowers or a large advertising billboard might have been planted on it.

Although both analogies given above have an implied direction (that of the water flow, or of the road orientation), cloaks are often designed so as to be isotropic, i.e. to work equally well for all orientations. However, they do not need to be so general, and might only work in two dimensions, as in the original electromagnetic demonstration, or only from one side, as for the so-called carpet cloak.

Spatial cloaks have other characteristics: whatever they contain can (in principle) be kept invisible forever, since an object inside the cloak may simply remain there. Signals emitted by the objects inside the cloak that are not absorbed can likewise be trapped forever by its internal structure. If a spatial cloak could be turned off and on again at will, the objects inside would then appear and disappear accordingly.

== Space-time cloaking ==
The event cloak is a means of manipulating electromagnetic radiation in space and time in such a way that a certain collection of happenings, or events, is concealed from distant observers. Conceptually, a safecracker can enter a scene, steal the cash and exit, whilst a surveillance camera records the safe door locked and undisturbed all the time. The concept utilizes the science of metamaterials in which light can be made to behave in ways that are not found in naturally occurring materials.

The event cloak works by designing a medium in which different parts of the light illuminating a certain region can be either slowed or accelerated. A leading portion of the light is accelerated so that it arrives before the events occur, whilst a trailing part is slowed and arrives too late. After their occurrence, the light is reformed by slowing the leading part and accelerating the trailing part. The distant observer only sees a continuous illumination, whilst the events that occurred during the dark period of the cloak's operation remain undetected. The concept can be related to traffic flowing along a highway: at a certain point some cars are accelerated up, whilst the ones behind are slowed. The result is a temporary gap in the traffic allowing a pedestrian to cross. After this, the process can be reversed so that the traffic resumes its continuous flow without a gap. Regarding the cars as light particles (photons), the act of the pedestrian crossing the road is never suspected by the observer down the highway, who sees an uninterrupted and unperturbed flow of cars.

For absolute concealment, the events must be non-radiating. If they do emit light during their occurrence (e.g. by fluorescence), then this light is received by the distant observer as a single flash.

Applications of the Event Cloak include the possibility to achieve `interrupt-without-interrupt' in data channels that converge at a node. A primary calculation can be temporarily suspended to process priority information from another channel. Afterwards the suspended channel can be resumed in such a way as to appear as though it was never interrupted.

The idea of the event cloak was first proposed by a team of researchers at Imperial College London (UK) in 2010, and published in the Journal of Optics. An experimental demonstration of the basic concept using nonlinear optical technology has been presented in a preprint on the Cornell physics arXiv. This uses time lenses to slow down and speed up the light, and thereby improves on the original proposal from McCall et al. which instead relied on the nonlinear refractive index of optical fibres. The experiment claims a cloaked time interval of about 10 picoseconds, but that extension into the nanosecond and microsecond regimes should be possible.

An event cloaking scheme that requires a single dispersive medium (instead of two successive media with opposite dispersion) has also been proposed based on accelerating wavepackets. The idea is based on modulating a part of a monochromatic light wave with a discontinuous nonlinear frequency chirp so that two opposite accelerating caustics are created in space–time as the different frequency components propagate at different group velocities in the dispersive medium. Due to the structure of the frequency chirp, the expansion and contraction of the time gap happen continuously in the same medium thus creating a biconvex time gap that conceals the enclosed events.

== Anomalous localized resonance cloaking ==
In 2006, the same year as the first metamaterial cloak, another type of cloak was proposed. This type of cloaking exploits resonance of light waves while matching the resonance of another object. In particular a particle placed near a superlens would appear to disappear as the light surrounding the particle resonates as the same frequency as the superlens. The resonance would effectively cancel out the light reflecting from the particle, rendering the particle electromagnetically invisible.

== Cloaking objects at a distance ==
In 2009, a passive cloaking device was designed to be an 'external invisibility device' that leaves the concealed object out in the open so that it can 'see' its surroundings. This is based on the premise that cloaking research has not adequately provided a solution to an inherent problem; because no electromagnetic radiation can enter or leave the cloaked space, this leaves the concealed object of the cloak without ability to detect visually, or otherwise, anything outside the cloaked space.

Such a cloaking device is also capable of 'cloaking' only parts of an object, such as opening a virtual peep hole on a wall so as to see the other side.

The traffic analogy used above for the spatial cloak can be adapted (albeit imperfectly) to describe this process. Imagine that a car has broken down in the vicinity of the roundabout, and is disrupting the traffic flow, causing cars to take different routes or creating a traffic jam. This exterior cloak corresponds to a carefully misshapen roundabout which manages to cancel or counteract the effect of the broken down car – so that as the traffic flow departs, there is again no evidence in it of either the roundabout or of the broken down car.

== Plasmonic cover ==
The plasmonic cover, mentioned alongside metamaterial covers (see plasmonic metamaterials), theoretically utilizes plasmonic resonance effects to reduce the total scattering cross section of spherical and cylindrical objects. These are lossless metamaterial covers near their plasma resonance which could possibly induce a dramatic drop in the scattering cross section, making these objects nearly "invisible" or "transparent" to an outside observer. Low loss, even no-loss, passive covers might be utilized that do not require high dissipation, but rely on a completely different mechanism.

Materials with either negative or low value constitutive parameters, are required for this effect. Certain metals near their plasma frequency, or metamaterials with negative parameters could fill this need. For example, several noble metals achieve this requirement because of their electrical permittivity at the infra-red or visible wavelengths with relatively low loss.

Currently only microscopically small objects could possibly appear transparent.

These materials are further described as a homogeneous, isotropic, metamaterial covers near plasma frequency dramatically reducing the fields scattered by a given object. Furthermore, These do not require any absorptive process, any anisotropy or inhomogeneity, and nor any interference cancellation.

The "classical theory" of metamaterial covers works with light of only one specific frequency. A new research, of Kort-Kamp et al, who won the prize "School on Nonlinear Optics and Nanophotonics" of 2013, shows that is possible to tune the metamaterial to different light frequencies.

== Tunneling light transmission cloak ==
As implied in the nomenclature, this is a type of light transmission. Transmission of light (EM radiation) through an object such as metallic film occurs with an assist of tunnelling between resonating inclusions. This effect can be created by embedding a periodic configuration of dielectrics in a metal, for example. By creating and observing transmission peaks interactions between the dielectrics and interference effects cause mixing and splitting of resonances. With an effective permittivity close to unity, the results can be used to propose a method for turning the resulting materials invisible.

== More research in cloaking technology ==
There are other proposals for use of the cloaking technology.

In 2007 cloaking with metamaterials is reviewed and deficiencies are presented. At the same time, theoretical solutions are presented that could improve the capability to cloak objects. Later in 2007, a mathematical improvement in the cylindrical shielding to produce an electromagnetic "wormhole", is analyzed in three dimensions. Electromagnetic wormholes, as an optical device (not gravitational) are derived from cloaking theories has potential applications for advancing some current technology.

Other advances may be realized with an acoustic superlens. In addition, acoustic metamaterials have realized negative refraction for sound waves. Possible advances could be enhanced ultrasound scans, sharpening sonic medical scans, seismic maps with more detail, and buildings no longer susceptible to earthquakes. Underground imaging may be improved with finer details. The acoustic superlens, acoustic cloaking, and acoustic metamaterials translates into novel applications for focusing, or steering, sonic waves.

Acoustic cloaking technology could be used to stop a sonar-using observer from detecting the presence of an object that would normally be detectable as it reflects or scatters sound waves. Ideally, the technology would encompass a broad spectrum of vibrations on a variety of scales. The range might be from miniature electronic or mechanical components up to large earthquakes. Although most progress has been made on mathematical and theoretical solutions, a laboratory metamaterial device for evading sonar has been recently demonstrated. It can be applied to sound wavelengths from 40 to 80 kHz.

Waves also apply to bodies of water. A theory has been developed for a cloak that could "hide", or protect, man-made platforms, ships, and natural coastlines from destructive ocean waves, including tsunamis.

== See also ==
- Chirality (electromagnetism)
- Invisibility
- Metamaterial absorber
- Metamaterial antennas
- Negative index metamaterials
- Nonlinear metamaterials
- Photonic metamaterials
- Photonic crystal
- Seismic metamaterials
- Split-ring resonator
- Tunable metamaterials

Books

- Metamaterials Handbook
- Metamaterials: Physics and Engineering Explorations
