= NPV =

NPV may refer to:

== Society ==
- Net present value, an economic standard method for evaluating competing long-term projects in capital budgeting
- National Popular Vote Interstate Compact, an initiative in the United States to elect the presidential candidate with the most votes nationwide
- De Nederlandse Padvinders (Netherlands Pathfinders), a precursor to Scouting Nederland, the national scouting organisation of the Netherlands

== Science ==
- Negative predictive value, in biostatistics, the proportion of patients with negative test results who are correctly diagnosed
- Nuclear Polyhedrosis Virus, a virus that infects butterflies and moths
- Negative Phase Velocity, an electromagnetic property induced by some exotic optical materials
- Negative pressure ventilator, a type of mechanical ventilator that stimulates an ill person's breathing by periodically applying negative air pressure to their body to expand and contract the chest cavity
