= Multiple layered plasmonics =

Technology for manipulating plasmons

Multiple layered plasmonics use electronically responsive media to change and manipulate the plasmonic properties of plasmons. The properties typically being manipulated can include the directed scattering of light and light absorption. The use of these to use “changeable” plasmonics is currently undergoing development in the academic community by allowing them to have multiple sets of functions that are dependent on how they are being manipulated or excited. Under these new manipulations, such as multiple layers that respond to different resonant frequencies, their new functions were designed to accomplish multiple objectives in a single application.

== Overview ==
This article provides an overview of current developing medical usage of multiple layered plasmonics, more specifically those developed by the Halas Group at Rice University

In addition to the bio-medical applications purposed, several other uses will be briefly described below.

== Bio-medical applications ==
Gold shelled nanoparticles, which are spherical nanoparticles with silica cores and gold shells, are used in cancer therapy and bio imaging enhancement. Theranostic probes – capable of detection and treatment of cancer in a single treatment - are nanoparticles that have binding sites on their shell that allow them to attach to a desired location (typically cancerous cells) then can be imaged through dual modality imagery (an imaging strategy that uses x-rays and radionuclide imaging) and through near-infrared fluorescence. The reason gold nanoparticles are used is due to their vivid optical properties which are controlled by their size, geometry, and their surface plasmons. Gold nanoparticles (such as AuNPs) have the benefit of being biocompatible and the flexibility to have multiple different molecules and fundamental materials, attached to their shell (almost anything that can normally be attached to gold can be attached to the gold nano-shell, helping in identifying and treating cancer). The treatment of cancer is possible only because of the scattering and absorption that occurs for plasmonics. Under scattering, the gold plated nanoparticles become visible to imaging processes that are tuned to the correct wavelength which is dependent upon the size and geometry of the particles. Under absorption, photothermal ablation occurs, which heats the nanoparticles and their immediate surroundings to temperatures capable of killing the surrounding cells. Additionally, these nanoparticles can be made to release antisense DNA oligonucleotides when under photo-activation. These oligonucleotides are used in conjunction with the photo-thermal ablation treatments to perform gene-therapy. This is accomplished because nanoparticle complexes are delivered inside of cells then undergo light induced release of DNA from their surface. This will allow for the internal manipulation of a cell and provide a means for monitoring a group cells return to equilibrium.

Another example of multiple layered plasmonics involves placing drugs inside of the nanoparticle and using it as a vehicle to deliver toxic drugs to cancerous sites only. This is accomplished by coating the outside of a nanoparticle with iron oxide (allowing for easy tracking with an MRI machine) then once the area of the tumor is coated with the drug filled nanoparticles, the nanoparticles can be activated using resonant light waves to release the drug.

== Other applications ==
=== Active plasmonics ===
Multiple layered plasmonics can be coated in nanoparticles to modify or drive a reaction near a metallic surface when properly excited. Additionally, the scattering of light from these plasmonics can be controlled and even directed based on the surface particles, geometry, and size.

=== Energy applications ===
Multiple layered plasmonics can be used in harvesting solar radiation for energy applications. This is accomplished by redirecting incident light into the waveguide and evanescent surface modes of thin film photovoltaic devices.

Using multiple layered plasmons to purify water is also being investigated.

For more information on the research behind energy applications, and the collaborations behind this research, please visit the Halas group website listed below in the external links.
