= Transformation optics =

Branch of optics which studies how EM radiation can be manipulated with metamaterials

Transformation optics is a branch of optics which applies metamaterials to produce spatial variations, derived from coordinate transformations, which can direct chosen bandwidths of electromagnetic radiation. This can allow for the construction of new composite artificial devices, which probably could not exist without metamaterials and coordinate transformation. Computing power that became available in the late 1990s enables prescribed quantitative values for the permittivity and permeability, the constitutive parameters, which produce localized spatial variations. The aggregate value of all the constitutive parameters produces an effective value, which yields the intended or desired results.

Hence, complex artificial materials, known as metamaterials, are used to produce transformations in optical space.

The mathematics underpinning transformation optics is similar to the equations that describe how gravity warps space and time, in general relativity. However, instead of space and time, these equations show how light can be directed in a chosen manner, analogous to warping space. For example, one potential application is collecting sunlight with novel solar cells by concentrating the light in one area. Hence, a wide array of conventional devices could be markedly enhanced by applying transformation optics.

== Coordinate transformations ==
Transformation optics has its beginnings in two research endeavors, and their conclusions. They were published on May 25, 2006, in the same issue of the peer-reviewed journal Science. The two papers describe tenable theories on bending or distorting light to electromagnetically conceal an object. Both papers notably map the initial configuration of the electromagnetic fields on to a Cartesian mesh. Twisting the Cartesian mesh, in essence, transforms the coordinates of the electromagnetic fields, which in turn conceal a given object. Hence, with these two papers, transformation optics is born.

Transformation optics subscribes to the capability of bending light, or electromagnetic waves and energy, in any preferred or desired fashion, for a desired application. Maxwell's equations do not vary even though coordinates transform. Instead values of chosen parameters of materials "transform", or alter, during a certain time period. Transformation optics developed from the capability to choose which parameters for a given material, known as a metamaterial. Hence, since Maxwell's equations retain the same form, it is the successive values of permittivity and permeability that change, over time. Permittivity and permeability are in a sense responses to the electric and magnetic fields of a radiated light source respectively, among other descriptions. The precise degree of electric and magnetic response can be controlled in a metamaterial, point by point. Since so much control can be maintained over the responses of the material, this leads to an enhanced and highly flexible gradient-index material. Conventionally predetermined refractive index of ordinary materials become independent spatial gradients, that can be controlled at will. Therefore, transformation optics is a new method for creating novel and unique optical devices.

Transformation optics can go beyond cloaking (mimic celestial mechanics) because its control of the trajectory and path of light is highly effective. Transformation optics is a field of optical and material engineering and science embracing nanophotonics, plasmonics, and optical metamaterials.

== Developments ==
Developments in this field focus on advances in research of transformation optics. Transformation optics is the foundation for exploring a diverse set of theoretical, numerical, and experimental developments, involving the perspectives of the physics and engineering communities. The multi-disciplinary perspectives for inquiry and designing of materials develop understanding of their behaviors, properties, and potential applications for this field.

If a coordinate transformation can be derived or described, a ray of light (in the optical limit) will follow lines of a constant coordinate. There are constraints on the transformations, as listed in the references. In general, however, a particular goal can be accomplished using more than one transformation. The classic cylindrical cloak (first both simulated and demonstrated experimentally) can be created with many transformations. The simplest, and most often used, is a linear coordinate mapping in the radial coordinate. There is significant ongoing research into determining advantages and disadvantages of particular types of transformations, and what attributes are desirable for realistic transformations. One example of this is the broadband carpet cloak: the transformation used was quasi-conformal. Such a transformation can yield a cloak that uses non-extreme values of permittivity and permeability, unlike the classic cylindrical cloak, which required some parameters to vary towards infinity at the inner radius of the cloak.

General coordinate transformations can be derived which compress or expand space, bend or twist space, or even change the topology (e.g. by mimicking a wormhole). Much current interest involves designing invisibility cloaks, event cloaks, field concentrators, or beam-bending waveguides.

== Mimicking celestial mechanics ==
The interactions of light and matter with spacetime, as predicted by general relativity, can be studied using the new type of artificial optical materials that feature extraordinary abilities to bend light (which is actually electromagnetic radiation). This research creates a link between the newly emerging field of artificial optical metamaterials to that of celestial mechanics, thus opening a new possibility to investigate astronomical phenomena in a laboratory setting. The recently introduced, new class, of specially designed optical media can mimic the periodic, quasi-periodic and chaotic motions observed in celestial objects that have been subjected to gravitational fields.

Hence, a new class of metamaterials introduced with the nomenclature "continuous-index photon traps" (CIPTs). CIPTz have applications as optical cavities. As such, CIPTs can control, slow and trap light in a manner similar to celestial phenomena such as black holes, strange attractors, and gravitational lenses.

A composite of air and the dielectric Gallium Indium Arsenide Phosphide (GaInAsP), operated in the infrared spectral range and featured a high refractive index with low absorptions.

This opens an avenue to investigate light phenomena that imitates orbital motion, strange attractors and chaos in a controlled laboratory environment by merging the study of optical metamaterials with classical celestial mechanics.

If a metamaterial could be produced that did not have high intrinsic loss and a narrow frequency range of operation then it could be employed as a type of media to simulate light motion in a curved spacetime vacuum. Such a proposal is brought forward, and metamaterials become prospective media in this type of study. The classical optical-mechanical analogy renders the possibility for the study of light propagation in homogeneous media as an accurate analogy to the motion of massive bodies, and light, in gravitational potentials. A direct mapping of the celestial phenomena is accomplished by observing photon motion in a controlled laboratory environment. The materials could facilitate periodic, quasi-periodic and chaotic light motion inherent to celestial objects subjected to complex gravitational fields.

Twisting the optical metamaterial effects its "space" into new coordinates. The light that travels in real space will be curved in the twisted space, as applied in transformational optics. This effect is analogous to starlight when it moves through a closer gravitational field and experiences curved spacetime or a gravitational lensing effect. This analogue between classic electromagnetism and general relativity, shows the potential of optical metamaterials to study relativity phenomena such as the gravitational lens.

Observations of such celestial phenomena by astronomers can sometimes take a century of waiting. Chaos in dynamic systems is observed in areas as diverse as molecular motion, population dynamics and optics. In particular, a planet around a star can undergo chaotic motion if a perturbation, such as another large planet, is present. However, owing to the large spatial distances between the celestial bodies, and the long periods involved in the study of their dynamics, the direct observation of chaotic planetary motion has been a challenge. The use of the optical-mechanical analogy may enable such studies to be accomplished in a bench-top laboratory setting at any prescribed time.

The study also points toward the design of novel optical cavities and photon traps for application in microscopic devices and lasers systems.

- For related information see:Chaos theory and General relativity

=== Producing black holes with metamaterials ===
Matter propagating in a curved spacetime is similar to the electromagnetic wave propagation in a curved space and in an in homogeneous metamaterial, as stated in the previous section. Hence a black hole can possibly be simulated using electromagnetic fields and metamaterials. In July 2009 a metamaterial structure forming an effective black hole was theorized, and numerical simulations showed a highly efficient light absorption.

The first experimental demonstration of electromagnetic black hole at microwave frequencies occurred in October 2009. The proposed black hole was composed of non-resonant, and resonant, metamaterial structures, which can absorb electromagnetic waves efficiently coming from all directions due to the local control of electromagnetic fields. It was constructed of a thin cylinder at 21.6 centimeters in diameter comprising 60 concentric rings of metamaterials. This structure created a gradient index of refraction, necessary for bending light in this way. However, it was characterized as being artificially inferior substitute for a real black hole. The characterization was justified by an absorption of only 80% in the microwave range, and that it has no internal source of energy. It is singularly a light absorber. The light absorption capability could be beneficial if it could be adapted to technologies such as solar cells. However, the device is limited to the microwave range.

Also in 2009, transformation optics were employed to mimic a black hole of Schwarzschild form. Similar properties of photon sphere were also found numerically for the metamaterial black hole. Several reduced versions of the black hole systems were proposed for easier implementations.

MIT computer simulations by Fung along with lab experiments are designing a metamaterial with a multilayer sawtooth structure that slows and absorbs light over a wide range of wavelength frequencies, and at a wide range of incident angles, at 95% efficiency. This has an extremely wide window for colors of light.

=== Multi-dimensional universe ===
Engineering optical space with metamaterials could be useful to reproduce an accurate laboratory model of the physical multiverse. "This 'metamaterial landscape' may include regions in which one or two spatial dimensions are compactified." Metamaterial models appear to be useful for non-trivial models such as 3D de Sitter space with one compactified dimension, 2D de Sitter space with two compactified dimensions, 4D de Sitter dS4, and anti-de Sitter AdS4 spaces.

== Gradient index lensing ==
Transformation optics is employed to increase capabilities of gradient index lenses.

=== Conventional optical limitations ===
Optical elements (lenses) perform a variety of functions, ranging from image formation, to light projection or light collection. The performance of these systems is frequently limited by their optical elements, which dominate system weight and cost, and force tradeoffs between system parameters such as focal length, field of view (or acceptance angle), resolution, and range.

Conventional lenses are ultimately limited by geometry. Available design parameters are a single index of refraction (n) per lens element, variations in the element surface profile, including continuous surfaces (lens curvature) and/or discontinuous surfaces (diffractive optics). Light rays undergo refraction at the surfaces of each element, but travel in straight lines within the lens. Since the design space of conventional optics is limited to a combination of refractive index and surface structure, correcting for aberrations (for example through the use of achromatic or diffractive optics) leads to large, heavy, complex designs, and/or greater losses, lower image quality, and manufacturing difficulties.

=== GRIN lenses ===
Gradient index lenses (or GRIN lenses) as the name implies, are optical elements whose index of refraction varies within the lens. Control of the internal refraction allows the steering of light in curved trajectories through the lens. GRIN optics thus increase the design space to include the entire volume of the optical elements, providing the potential for dramatically reduced size, weight, element count, and assembly cost, as well as opening up new space to trade between performance parameters. However, past efforts to make large aperture GRIN lenses have had limited success due to restricted refractive index change, poor control over index profiles, and/or severe limitations in lens diameter.

=== Recent advances ===
Recent steps forward in material science have led to at least one method for developing large (>10 mm) GRIN lenses with 3-dimensional gradient indexes. There is a possibility of adding expanded deformation capabilities to the GRIN lenses. This translates into controlled expansion, contraction, and shear (for variable focus lenses or asymmetric optical variations). These capabilities have been demonstrated. Additionally, recent advances in transformation optics and computational power provide a unique opportunity to design, assemble and fabricate elements in order to advance the utility and availability of GRIN lenses across a wide range of optics-dependent systems, defined by needs. A possible future capability could be to further advance lens design methods and tools, which are coupled to enlarged fabrication processes.

== Battlefield applications ==
Transformation optics has potential applications for the battlefield. The versatile properties of metamaterials can be tailored to fit almost any practical need, and transformation optics shows that space for light can be bent in almost any arbitrary way. This is perceived as providing new capabilities to soldiers in the battlefield. For battlefield scenarios benefits from metamaterials have both short term and long-term impacts.

For example, determining whether a cloud in the distance is harmless or an aerosol of enemy chemical or biological warfare is very difficult to assess quickly. However, with the new metamaterials being developed, the ability exists to see things smaller than the wavelength of light – something which has yet to be achieved in the far field. Using metamaterials in the creation of a new lens may allow soldiers to be able to see pathogens and viruses that are impossible to detect with any visual device.

Harnessing subwavelength capabilities then allow for other advancements which appear to be beyond the battlefield. All kinds of materials could be manufactured with nano-manufacturing, which could go into electronic and optical devices from night vision goggles to distance sensors to other kinds of sensors. Longer-term views include the possibility for cloaking materials, which would provide "invisibility" by redirecting light around a cylindrical shape.

== See also ==
- Acoustic metamaterials
- Chirality (electromagnetism)
- Metamaterial
- Metamaterial absorber
- Metamaterial antennas
- Metamaterial cloaking
- Negative index metamaterials
- Nonlinear metamaterials
- Photonic metamaterials
- Photonic crystal
- Seismic metamaterials
- Split-ring resonator
- Superlens
- Theories of cloaking
- Tunable metamaterials
- Books
  - Metamaterials Handbook
  - Metamaterials: Physics and Engineering Explorations

== Further reading and general references ==
- Johnson, Steven (Mar 10, 2010). "Coordinate Transformation and Invariance in Electromagnetism" (PDF). Massachusetts Institute of Technology. "MIT course notes on the derivation of transformation optics."
- Hecht, Jeff; Opto IQ (Oct 1, 2009). "Photonic Frontiers: Metamaterials and Transformation Optics". PennWell Corporation. "Newest metamaterials promise customized optical properties"
- BioScience Technology (Oct 1, 2009). "Artificial black holes made with metamaterials". Advantage Business Media.
- Pendry, John (2009). "Metamaterials & Transformation Optics" (PDF). Imperial College – The Blackett Laboratory.
- Toronto (Oct 28, 2019). "Canadian-made 'invisibility shield' could hide people, spacecraft". Jonathan Forani.
- Chen, Huanyang; Chan, C. T.; Sheng, Ping (2010). "Transformation optics and metamaterials". Nature Materials. 9 (5): 387–96. Bibcode:2010NatMa...9..387C. doi:10.1038/nmat2743. PMID 20414221.
- Shyroki, Dzmitry M. (2003). "Note on transformation to general curvilinear coordinates for Maxwell's curl equations". arXiv:physics/0307029.
- Ward, A. J.; Pendry, J. B. (1996). "Refraction and geometry in Maxwell's equations". Journal of Modern Optics. 43 (4): 773. Bibcode:1996JMOp...43..773W. CiteSeerX 10.1.1.205.5758. doi:10.1080/09500349608232782.
- Leonhardt, Ulf; Philbin, Thomas G. (2009). Chapter 2 Transformation Optics and the Geometry of Light. Progress in Optics. Vol. 53. pp. 69–152. arXiv:0805.4778. doi:10.1016/S0079-6638(08)00202-3. ISBN 978-0-444-53360-9. S2CID 15151960.
- Chen, Huanyang (2009). "Transformation optics in orthogonal coordinates". Journal of Optics A. 11 (7) 075102. arXiv:0812.4008. Bibcode:2009JOptA..11g5102C. doi:10.1088/1464-4258/11/7/075102.
- Nicolet, André; Zolla, Frédéric; Geuzaine, Christophe (2010). "Transformation Optics, Generalized Cloaking and Superlenses". IEEE Transactions on Magnetics. 46 (8): 2975. arXiv:1002.1644. Bibcode:2010ITM....46.2975N. doi:10.1109/TMAG.2010.2043073. S2CID 12891014.
- Cai, Wenshan; Vladimir Shalaev (November 2009). Optical Metamaterials: Fundamentals and Applications. New York: Springer-Verlag. pp. Chapter 9. ISBN 978-1-4419-1150-6.
