= Plasmonic metamaterial =

Metamaterial that uses surface plasmons to achieve optical properties not seen in nature

A plasmonic metamaterial is a metamaterial that uses surface plasmons to achieve optical properties not seen in nature. Plasmons are produced from the interaction of light with metal-dielectric materials. Under specific conditions, the incident light couples with the surface plasmons to create self-sustaining, propagating electromagnetic waves known as surface plasmon polaritons (SPPs). Once launched, the SPPs ripple along the metal-dielectric interface. Compared with the incident light, the SPPs can be much shorter in wavelength.

The properties stem from the unique structure of the metal-dielectric composites, with features smaller than the wavelength of light separated by subwavelength distances. Light hitting such a metamaterial is transformed into surface plasmon polaritons, which are shorter in wavelength than the incident light.

== Plasmonic materials ==
Plasmonic materials are metals or metal-like materials that exhibit negative real permittivity. The most common plasmonic materials are gold and silver. However, many other materials show metal-like optical properties in specific wavelength ranges. Various research groups are experimenting with different approaches to make plasmonic materials that exhibit lower losses and tunable optical properties.

== Negative index ==
Plasmonic metamaterials are realizations of materials first proposed by Victor Veselago, a Russian theoretical physicist, in 1967. Also known as left-handed or negative index materials, Veselago theorized that they would exhibit optical properties opposite to those of glass or air. In negative index materials energy is transported in a direction opposite to that of propagating wavefronts, rather than paralleling them, as is the case in positive index materials.

Normally, light traveling from, say, air into water bends upon passing through the normal (a plane perpendicular to the surface) and entering the water. In contrast, light reaching a negative index material through air would not cross the normal. Rather, it would bend the opposite way.

Negative refraction was first reported for microwave and infrared frequencies. A negative refractive index in the optical range was first demonstrated in 2005 by Shalaev et al. (at the telecom wavelength λ = 1.5 μm) and by Brueck et al. (at λ = 2 μm) at nearly the same time. In 2007, a collaboration between the California Institute of Technology, and the NIST reported narrow band, negative refraction of visible light in two dimensions.

To create this response, incident light couples with the undulating, gas-like charges (plasmons) normally on the surface of metals. This photon-plasmon interaction results in SPPs that generate intense, localized optical fields. The waves are confined to the interface between metal and insulator. This narrow channel serves as a transformative guide that, in effect, traps and compresses the wavelength of incoming light to a fraction of its original value.

Nanomechanical systems incorporating metamaterials exhibit negative radiation pressure.

Light falling on conventional materials, with a positive index of refraction, exerts a positive pressure, meaning that it can push an object away from the light source. In contrast, illuminating negative index metamaterials should generate a negative pressure that pulls an object toward light.

=== Three-dimensional negative index ===
Computer simulations predict plasmonic metamaterials with a negative index in three dimensions. Potential fabrication methods include multilayer thin film deposition, focused ion beam milling and self-assembly.

=== Gradient index ===
PMMs can be made with a gradient index (a material whose refractive index varies progressively across the length or area of the material). One such material involved depositing a thermoplastic, known as a PMMA, on a gold surface via electron beam lithography.

=== Hyperbolic ===
Hyperbolic metamaterials behave as a metal when light passes through it in one direction and like a dielectric when light passes in the perpendicular direction, called extreme anisotropy. The material's dispersion relation forms a hyperboloid. The associated wavelength can in principle be infinitely small. Recently, hyperbolic metasurfaces in the visible region has been demonstrated with silver or gold nanostructures by lithographic techniques. The reported hyperbolic devices showed multiple functions for sensing and imaging, e.g., diffraction-free, negative refraction and enhanced plasmon resonance effects, enabled by their unique optical properties. These specific properties are also highly required to fabricate integrated optical meta-circuits for the quantum information applications.

== Isotropy ==
The first metamaterials created exhibit anisotropy in their effects on plasmons. I.e., they act only in one direction.

More recently, researchers used a novel self-folding technique to create a three-dimensional array of split-ring resonators that exhibits isotropy when rotated in any direction up to an incident angle of 40 degrees. Exposing strips of nickel and gold deposited on a polymer/silicon substrate to air allowed mechanical stresses to curl the strips into rings, forming the resonators. By arranging the strips at different angles to each other, 4-fold symmetry was achieved, which allowed the resonators to produce effects in multiple directions.

== Materials ==
=== Silicon sandwich ===
Negative refraction for visible light was first produced in a sandwich-like construction with thin layers. An insulating sheet of silicon nitride was covered by a film of silver and underlain by another of gold. The critical dimension is the thickness of the layers, which summed to a fraction of the wavelength of blue and green light. By incorporating this metamaterial into integrated optics on an IC chip, negative refraction was demonstrated over blue and green frequencies. The collective result is a relatively significant response to light.

=== Graphene ===
Graphene also accommodates surface plasmons, observed via near field infrared optical microscopy techniques and infrared spectroscopy. Potential applications of graphene plasmonics involve terahertz to midinfrared frequencies, in devices such as optical modulators, photodetectors and biosensors.

=== Superlattice ===
A hyperbolic metamaterial made from titanium nitride (metal) and aluminum scandium nitride (dielectric) have compatible crystal structures and can form a superlattice, a crystal that combines two (or more) materials. The material is compatible with existing CMOS technology (unlike traditional gold and silver), mechanically strong and thermally stable at higher temperatures. The material exhibits higher photonic densities of states than Au or Ag. The material is an efficient light absorber.

The material was created using epitaxy inside a vacuum chamber with a technique known as magnetron sputtering. The material featured ultra-thin and ultra-smooth layers with sharp interfaces.

Possible applications include a "planar hyperlens" that could make optical microscopes able to see objects as small as DNA, advanced sensors, more efficient solar collectors, nano-resonators, quantum computing and diffraction free focusing and imaging.

The material works across a broad spectrum from near-infrared to visible light. Near-infrared is essential for telecommunications and optical communications, and visible light is important for sensors, microscopes and efficient solid-state light sources.

== Applications ==
=== Microscopy ===
One potential application is microscopy beyond the diffraction limit. Gradient index plasmonics were used to produce Luneburg and Eaton lenses that interact with surface plasmon polaritons rather than photons.

A theorized superlens could exceed the diffraction limit that prevents standard (positive-index) lenses from resolving objects smaller than one-half of the wavelength of visible light. Such a superlens would capture spatial information that is beyond the view of conventional optical microscopes. Several approaches to building such a microscope have been proposed. The subwavelength domain could be optical switches, modulators, photodetectors and directional light emitters.

=== Biological and chemical sensing ===
Other proof-of-concept applications under review involve high sensitivity biological and chemical sensing. They may enable the development of optical sensors that exploit the confinement of surface plasmons within a certain type of Fabry-Perot nano-resonator. This tailored confinement allows efficient detection of specific bindings of target chemical or biological analytes using the spatial overlap between the optical resonator mode and the analyte ligands bound to the resonator cavity sidewalls. Structures are optimized using finite difference time domain electromagnetic simulations, fabricated using a combination of electron beam lithography and electroplating, and tested using both near-field and far-field optical microscopy and spectroscopy.

=== Optical computing ===
Optical computing replaces electronic signals with light processing devices.

In 2014 researchers announced a 200 nanometer, terahertz speed optical switch. The switch is made of a metamaterial consisting of nanoscale particles of vanadium dioxide (VO_{2}), a crystal that switches between an opaque, metallic phase and a transparent, semiconducting phase. The nanoparticles are deposited on a glass substrate and overlain by even smaller gold nanoparticles that act as a plasmonic photocathode.

Femtosecond laser pulses free electrons in the gold particles that jump into the VO_{2} and cause a subpicosecond phase change.

The device is compatible with current integrated circuit technology, silicon-based chips and high-K dielectrics materials. It operates in the visible and near-infrared region of the spectrum. It generates only 100 femtojoules/bit/operation, allowing the switches to be packed tightly.

=== Photovoltaics ===
Gold group metals (Au, Ag and Cu) have been used as direct active materials in photovoltaics and solar cells. The materials act simultaneously as electron and hole donor, and thus can be sandwiched between electron and hole transport layers to make a photovoltaic cell. At present these photovoltaic cells allow powering smart sensors for the Internet of Things (IoT) platform.

== See also ==
- History of metamaterials
- Metamaterial absorber
- Metamaterial antennas
- Metamaterial cloaking
- Nonlinear metamaterials
- Photonic metamaterials
- Photonic crystal
- Spoof surface plasmon
- Terahertz metamaterials
- Tunable metamaterials
- Transformation optics
- Theories of cloaking
