= Metamaterial absorber =

A metamaterial absorber is a type of metamaterial intended to efficiently absorb electromagnetic radiation such as light. Furthermore, metamaterials are an advance in materials science. Hence, those metamaterials that are designed to be absorbers offer benefits over conventional absorbers such as further miniaturization, wider adaptability, and increased effectiveness. Intended applications for the metamaterial absorber include emitters, photodetectors, sensors, spatial light modulators, infrared camouflage, wireless communication, and use in solar photovoltaics and thermophotovoltaics.

For practical applications, the metamaterial absorbers can be divided into two types: narrow band and broadband. For example, metamaterial absorbers can be used to improve the performance of photodetectors. Metamaterial absorbers can also be used for enhancing absorption in both solar photovoltaic and thermo-photovoltaic applications. Skin depth engineering can be used in metamaterial absorbers in photovoltaic applications as well as other optoelectronic devices, where optimizing the device performance demands minimizing resistive losses and power consumption, such as photodetectors, laser diodes, and light emitting diodes.

In addition, the advent of metamaterial absorbers enable researchers to further understand the theory of metamaterials which is derived from classical electromagnetic wave theory. This leads to understanding the material's capabilities and reasons for current limitations.

Unfortunately, achieving broadband absorption, especially in the THz region (and higher frequencies), still remains a challenging task because of the intrinsically narrow bandwidth of surface plasmon polaritons (SPPs) or localized surface plasmon resonances (LSPRs) generated on metallic surfaces at the nanoscale, which are exploited as a mechanism to obtain perfect absorption.

== Metamaterials ==
Metamaterials are artificial materials which exhibit unique properties which do not occur in nature. These are usually arrays of structures which are smaller than the wavelength they interact with. These structures have the capability to control electromagnetic radiation in unique ways that are not exhibited by conventional materials. It is the spacing and shape of a given metamaterial's components that define its use and the way it controls electromagnetic radiation. Unlike most conventional materials, researchers in this field can physically control electromagnetic radiation by altering the geometry of the material's components. Metamaterial structures are used in a wide range of applications and across a broad frequency range from radio frequencies, to microwave, terahertz, across the infrared spectrum and almost to visible wavelengths.

== Absorbers ==
"An electromagnetic absorber neither reflects nor transmits the incident radiation. Therefore, the power of the impinging wave is mostly absorbed in the absorber materials. The performance of an absorber depends on its thickness and morphology, and also the materials used to fabricate it."

"A near unity absorber is a device in which all incident radiation is absorbed at the operating frequency–transmissivity, reflectivity, scattering and all other light propagation channels are disabled. Electromagnetic (EM) wave absorbers can be categorized into two types: resonant absorbers and broadband absorbers.

== Principal conceptions ==
A metamaterial absorber utilizes the effective medium design of metamaterials and the loss components of permittivity and magnetic permeability to create a material that has a high ratio of electromagnetic radiation absorption. Loss is noted in applications of negative refractive index (photonic metamaterials, antenna systems metamaterials) or transformation optics (metamaterial cloaking, celestial mechanics), but is typically undesired in these applications.

Complex permittivity and permeability are derived from metamaterials using the effective medium approach. As effective media, metamaterials can be characterized with complex ε(w) = ε_{1} + iε_{2} for effective permittivity and μ(w) = μ_{1} + i μ_{2} for effective permeability. Complex values of permittivity and permeability typically correspond to attenuation in a medium. Most of the work in metamaterials is focused on the real parts of these parameters, which relate to wave propagation rather than attenuation. The loss (imaginary) components are small in comparison to the real parts and are often neglected in such cases.

However, the loss terms (ε_{2} and μ_{2}) can also be engineered to create high attenuation and correspondingly large absorption. By independently manipulating resonances in ε and μ it is possible to absorb both the incident electric and magnetic field. Additionally, a metamaterial can be impedance-matched to free space by engineering its permittivity and permeability, minimizing reflectivity. Thus, it becomes a highly capable absorber.

This approach can be used to create thin absorbers. Typical conventional absorbers are thick compared to wavelengths of interest, which is a problem in many applications. Since metamaterials are characterized based on their subwavelength nature, they can be used to create effective yet thin absorbers. This is not limited to electromagnetic absorption either.

== See also ==
- Negative index metamaterials
- History of metamaterials
- Metamaterial cloaking
- Nonlinear metamaterials
- Photonic crystal
- Seismic metamaterials
- Split-ring resonator
- Acoustic metamaterials
- Plasmonic metamaterials
- Superlens
- Terahertz metamaterials
- Transformation optics
- Theories of cloaking
