= Natural material =

Material that arises without the use of technology

A natural material comes from plants, animals, or the earth, and has not been made by humans. Minerals and the metals that can be extracted from them (without further modification) are also considered to belong into this category. Natural materials are used as building materials and clothing. Types include:

- Biotic materials
  - Wood (rattan, bamboo, bark, etc.)
- Plant fiber (coir, ramie, sisal, cotton, flax, hemp, jute, kapok, kenaf, moss, linen, abacá, etc.)
- Animal fiber (wool, silk, alpaca, camel, angora, cashmere, mohair, etc.)
- Inorganic material
  - Stone (flint, granite, limestone, obsidian, sandstone, sand, gems, glass, etc.)
  - Native metal (copper, iron, gold, silver, etc.)
  - Composites (clay, plasticine, etc.)
- Other natural materials.
  - Soil

== See also ==
- Alternative natural materials
- Dimension stone
- Earth shelter
- Earth structure
- Green building and wood
- Greystone (residential buildings made from limestone)
- Hempcrete
- Log house
- Material science
- Metamaterials
- Natural building
- Natural environment
- Natural product
- Natural resources
- Nature
- Rammed earth
- Straw-bale construction
