= Seismic metamaterial =

A seismic metamaterial is a metamaterial that is designed to counteract the adverse effects of seismic waves on artificial structures. Current designs of seismic metamaterials use configurations of boreholes, trees, or proposed underground resonators to act as a large-scale material. Experiments have observed both reflections and bandgap attenuation from artificially induced seismic waves. These are the first experiments to verify that seismic metamaterials can be measured for frequencies below 100 Hz, where damage from Rayleigh waves is the most harmful to artificial structures.

== The mechanics of seismic waves ==
More than a million earthquakes are recorded each year by a worldwide system of earthquake detection stations. The propagation velocity of the seismic waves depends on density and elasticity of the earth materials. In other words, the speeds of the seismic waves vary as they travel through different materials in the Earth. The two main components of a seismic event are body waves and surface waves. Both of these have different modes of wave propagation.

== Towards Seismic Cloaking ==
Computations showed that seismic waves traveling toward a building, could be directed around the building, leaving the building unscathed, by using seismic metamaterials. The very long wavelengths of earthquake waves would be shortened as they interact with the metamaterials; the waves would pass around the building so as to arrive in phase as the earthquake wave proceeded, as if the building was not there. The mathematical models produce the regular pattern provided by metamaterial cloaking. This method was first understood with electromagnetic cloaking metamaterials—the electromagnetic energy is in effect directed around an object, or hole, and protecting buildings from seismic waves employs this same principle.

Giant polymer-made split-ring resonators combined with other metamaterials are designed to couple at the seismic wavelength. Concentric layers of this material would be stacked, each layer separated by an elastic medium. The design that worked is ten layers of six different materials, which can be easily deployed in building foundations. As of 2009, the project is still in the design stage. In 2019, scientists identified flaws in models of seismic cloaks related to extrapolations from photonics, and proved that a perfect cloak, which bends out-of-plane waves completely away from a structure, is not feasible (though they can be dampened), but a cloak which protects against surface waves and dampens others is still possible.

=== Electromagnetic cloaking principles for seismic metamaterials ===
For seismic metamaterials to protect surface structures, the proposal includes a layered structure of metamaterials, separated by elastic plates in a cylindrical configuration. A prior simulation showed that it is possible to create concealment from electromagnetic radiation with concentric, alternating layers of electromagnetic metamaterials. That study is in contrast to concealment by inclusions in a split-ring resonator designed as an anisotropic metamaterial.

The configuration can be viewed as alternating layers of homogeneous isotropic dielectric material. Each dielectric material is much thinner than the radiated wavelength. As a whole, such a structure is an anisotropic medium. The layered dielectric materials surround a conducting cylinder. The layered dielectric materials radiate outward, in a concentric fashion, and the cylinder is encased in the first layer. The other layers alternate and surround the previous layer all the way to the first layer. Electromagnetic wave scattering was calculated and simulated for the layered (metamaterial) structure and the split-ring resonator anisotropic metamaterial, to show the effectiveness of the layered metamaterial.

=== Acoustic cloaking principles for seismic metamaterials ===
The theory and ultimate development for the seismic metamaterial is based on coordinate transformations achieved when concealing a small cylindrical object with electromagnetic waves. This was followed by an analysis of acoustic cloaking, and whether or not coordinate transformations could be applied to artificially fabricated acoustic materials.

Applying the concepts used to understand electromagnetic materials to material properties in other systems shows them to be closely analogous. Wave vector, wave impedance, and direction of power flow are universal. By understanding how permittivity and permeability control these components of wave propagation, applicable analogies can be used for other material interactions.

In most instances, applying coordinate transformation to engineered artificial elastic media is not possible. However, there is at least one special case where there is a direct equivalence between electromagnetics and elastodynamics. Furthermore, this case appears practically useful. In two dimensions, isotropic acoustic media and isotropic electromagnetic media are exactly equivalent. Under these conditions, the isotropic characteristic works in anisotropic media as well.

It has been demonstrated mathematically that the 2D Maxwell equations with normal incidence apply to 2D acoustic equations when replacing the electromagnetic parameters with the following acoustic parameters: pressure, vector fluid velocity, fluid mass density, and the fluid bulk modulus. The compressional wave solutions used in the electromagnetic cloaking are transferred to material fluidic solutions where fluid motion is parallel to the wavevector. The computations then show that coordinate transformations can be applied to acoustic media when restricted to normal incidence in two dimensions.

Next, the electromagnetic cloaking shell is referenced as an exact equivalence for a simulated demonstration of the acoustic cloaking shell. Bulk modulus and mass density determine the spatial dimensions of the cloak, which can bend any incident wave around the center of the shell. In a simulation with perfect conditions, because it is easier to demonstrate the principles involved, there is zero scattering in any direction.

=== The seismic cloak ===
However, it can be demonstrated through computation and visual simulation that the waves are in fact dispersed around the location of the building. The frequency range of this capability is shown to have no limitation regarding the radiated frequency. The cloak itself demonstrates no forward or back scattering; hence, the seismic cloak becomes an effective medium.

== Experiments on seismic metamaterials ==
In 2012, researchers held an experimental field-test near Grenoble, France, with the aim to highlight analogy with phononic crystals.

At the geophysics scale, in a forest in the Landes region of France in 2016, an ambitious seismic experiment called the METAFORET experiment demonstrated that trees could significantly modify the surface wavefield due to their coupled resonances when arranged at a subwavelength scale. Actual use of trees for earthquake protection is not feasible, since tree heights of 260–300 feet (79–91 m) are required to dampen waves produced by earthquakes, and the species of trees, such as redwoods, that are capable of reaching this height range when mature are slow-growing.

A follow-up field experiment called the META-WT experiment was performed in the Nauen wind farm. This for the first time demonstrated that, at the city scale, collective resonance of wind-turbine structures can modify seismic waves propagating through it. These new observations have implications for seismic hazard in a city where dense urban structures like tall buildings can strongly modify the wavefield.

== See also ==
- Negative index metamaterials
- Metamaterial antennas
- Photonic crystal
- Superlens
- Split-ring resonator
- Terahertz metamaterials
- Tunable metamaterials
- Photonic metamaterials

=== Material properties ===
- Acoustic dispersion
- Bulk modulus
- Constitutive equation
- Elastic wave
- Equation of state
- Linear elasticity
- Permeability
- Permittivity
- Stress (mechanics)
- Thermodynamic state
