= Metamaterials: Physics and Engineering Explorations =

Book by Nader Engheta

- Author: Nader Engheta and Richard W. Ziolkowski
- Language: English
- Subject: Engineering, physics, and applications of metamaterials
- Genre: Science, physics, material science
- Publisher: John Wiley & Sons & IEEE Press
- Publication date: 2006
- Publication place: USA
- Media type: Hardcover book
- Pages: xxi + 414
- ISBN: 978-0-471-76102-0
- OCLC: 61757037
- LC Class: 2007270747

Metamaterials: Physics and Engineering Explorations is a book length introduction to the fundamental research and advancements in electromagnetic composite substances known as electromagnetic metamaterials. The discussion encompasses examination of the physics of metamaterial interactions, the designs, and the perspectives of engineering regarding these materials. Also included throughout the book are potential applications, which are discussed at various points in each section of each chapter. The book encompasses a variety of theoretical, numerical, and experimental perspectives.

This book has been cited by a few hundred other peer-reviewed research efforts, mostly peer-reviewed science articles.

== Authors ==
Nader Engheta received his Ph.D. in Electrical Engineering (with a minor in Physics), in 1982 from the California Institute of Technology. Currently he is a Professor of Electrical and Systems Engineering, and Professor of Bioengineering at the University of Pennsylvania. His current research activities include metamaterials, plasmonics, nano-optics, nanophotonics, bio-inspired sensing and imaging, miniaturized antennas and nanoantennas.

Richard W. Ziolkowski received both his M.S. and Ph.D. in physics, in 1975 and 1980, respectively from the University of Illinois at Urbana-Champaign. Currently he has a dual appointment at the University of Arizona. He is a Professor of Electrical and Computer Engineering, and a Professor of the Optical Sciences. His current research includes metamaterial physics and engineering related to low frequency and high frequency antenna systems, and includes nanoparticle lasers.

Through their respective research, both Engheta and Ziolkowski have each contributed significantly to advancing metamaterials. Ziolkowski has been described as being at the leading edge of metamaterials research since a Defense Advanced Research Projects Agency (DARPA) workshop, in November, 1999.

== Research ==
Nader Engheta and Richard W. Ziolkowski, are also the editors of this book. They have compiled the published research related to metamaterials at the end of each chapter of this book. The content of each chapter describes the path the current research is taking in its respective domain. Included are descriptions of basic research (physics), and how it is applied (engineering). The chapters are written by contributors who are carrying out the actual research and applications, including some chapter contributions by Engheta and Ziolkowski.

Hence, the content of the book also consists of original research papers by researchers in the field, who are knowledgeable about metamaterials, and who have made significant contributions, to the advancement and understanding of metamaterials. (Note: In this book's preface, the authors refer to the other contributors as "experts who are active in this area of research" p. xv.) These persons were invited to present their discoveries and some conclusions, while researching metamaterials. Included in their findings are the state of the art developments in applications for antennas, waveguides, and related devices, and components.

== Scope ==
The first chapter opens with a very brief overview of the history of metamaterials. Afterwards, a history treatment is interspersed throughout the book, which frames the discussion of the related section or chapter. The organizational structure of the book begins with dividing the subject, electromagnetic metamaterials, into two major classes of metamaterials. The first major class is the SNG and DNG metamaterials, and the second major class is EBG structured metamaterials.

The organizational format relates the SNG and DNG metamaterials into one class. This class is described by its common structure which is the subwavelength size of the inclusions, and the periodicity of the structure. The inclusions, or cells, are artificially arrayed into an ordered, repeating pattern, of equal dimensions and equidistant spacing. Such structures are then conceptually described as being homogenous and as effective media.

EBG metamaterials, on the other hand, can be described by other periodic media concepts.

These classes are sub-divided further into their three-dimensional (3D volumetric) and two-dimensional (2D planar or surface) realizations. Examples of the aforementioned types of metamaterials are provided and their known and anticipated properties are described.

In all, there are 14 chapters, along with a preface by the authors.

== Coverage ==
The book presents broad coverage of electromagnetic metamaterials. Coverage also includes theoretical, numerical, and experimental perspectives of the contributors, along with current and intended applications. The extensive peer reviewed article reference lists, at the end of each chapter, are noteworthy.

== See also ==
- Metamaterials Handbook
- Victor Veselago (Originator of metamaterials)
- History of metamaterials
- Metamaterials (journal)
