= Metamaterials Handbook =

Handbook on metamaterials

- Cover of Metamaterials Handbook Vol. 2, Applications of Metamaterials
- Theory and Phenomena of Metamaterials (ISBN 978-1-4200-5425-5); Applications of Metamaterials (ISBN 978-1-4200-5423-1)'
- Edited by: Filippo Capolino
- Country: United States
- Language: English
- Discipline: Science; Metamaterials
- Publisher: Taylor & Francis
- Published: October 5, 2009
- Media type: Print Hardback, Microform, E-book; ISBN 978-1-4200-5362-3
- No. of books: 2

Metamaterials Handbook is a two-volume handbook on metamaterials edited by Filippo Capolino professor of electrical engineering in University of California.

The series is designed to cover all theory and application topics related to electromagnetic metamaterials. Disciplines have combined to study, and develop electromagnetic metamaterials. Some of these disciplines are optics, physics, electromagnetic theory (including computational methods) microfabrication, microwaves, nanofabrication, nanotechnology, and nanochemistry.

== Theory and Phenomena of Metamaterials ==
Theory and Phenomena of Metamaterials is the first volume of the Metamaterials Handbook. It contains contributions from researchers (scientists) who have produced accepted results in the field of metamaterials. Most of the contributors are associated with Metamorphose VI AISBL, a non-profit, European organization that focuses on artificial electromagnetic materials and metamaterials. Metamorphose provided access to the network of contributors (researchers) who work in a variety of scientific disciplines, involved with metamaterials

This book is in an article review format, covering prior work in metamaterials. It focuses on theories underpinning metamaterial research along with the properties of metamaterials. The text covers all areas of metamaterial research.

== Applications of Metamaterials ==
Applications of Metamaterials is the second volume of the Metamaterials Handbook. This book derives its organization for discussion of its topics from the previous volume. Theory, modeling, and basic properties of metamaterials that were explored in the first volume, are now shown how they work when applied. Devices based on electromagnetic metamaterials continue to expand understanding of principles and modeling begun in the first volume. The applications for metamaterials are shown to be wide-ranging, encompassing electronics, telecommunications, sensing, medical instrumentation, and data storage. This book also discusses the key domains of where metamaterials have already been developed.

The material in this book is obtained from highly regarded sources, such as many scientific, peer reviewed, journal articles.

== See also ==
- Metamaterials
- Metamaterials (journal)
- Metamaterials: Physics and Engineering Explorations
- History of metamaterials
