= Spoof surface plasmon =

Spoof surface plasmons, also known as spoof surface plasmon polaritons and designer surface plasmons, are surface electromagnetic waves in microwave and terahertz regimes that propagate along planar interfaces with sign-changing permittivities. Spoof surface plasmons are a type of surface plasmon polariton, which ordinarily propagate along metal and dielectric interfaces in infrared and visible frequencies. Since surface plasmon polaritons cannot exist naturally in microwave and terahertz frequencies due to dispersion properties of metals, spoof surface plasmons necessitate the use of artificially-engineered metamaterials.

Spoof surface plasmons share the natural properties of surface plasmon polaritons, such as dispersion characteristics and subwavelength field confinement. They were first theorized by John Pendry et al.

== Theory ==
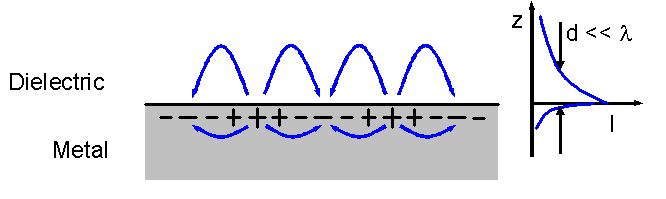
SPP oscillation in between a metal-dielectric interface

Surface plasmon polaritons (SPP) result from the coupling of delocalized electron oscillations ("surface plasmon") to electromagnetic waves ("polariton"). SPPs propagate along the interface between a positive- and a negative-permittivity material. These waves decay perpendicularly from the interface ("evanescent field"). For a plasmonic medium that is stratified along the z-direction in Cartesian coordinates, dispersion relation for SPPs can be obtained from solving Maxwell's equations:

$$k_x=\frac{\omega}{c} \left( \frac{\varepsilon_1 \varepsilon_2}{\varepsilon_1 + \varepsilon_2} \right)^{\frac{1}{2}}$$

where

- $k_x$ is the wave vector that is parallel to the interface. It is in the direction of propagation.
- $\omega$ is the angular frequency.
- $c$ is the speed of light.
- $\varepsilon_1$ and $\varepsilon_2$ are the relative permittivies for metal and the dielectric.

Per this relation, SPPs have shorter wavelengths than light in free space for a frequency band below surface plasmon frequency; this property, as well as subwavelength confinement, enables new applications in subwavelength optics and systems beyond the diffraction-limit. Nevertheless, for lower frequency bands such as microwave and terahertz, surface plasmon polariton modes are not supported; metals function approximately as perfect electrical conductors with imaginary dielectric functions in this regime. Per the effective medium approach, metal surfaces with subwavelength structural elements can mimic the plasma behaviour, resulting in artificial surface plasmon polariton excitations with similar dispersion behaviour.

For the canonical case of a metamaterial medium that is formed by thin metallic wires on a periodic square lattice, the effective relative permittivity can be represented by the Drude model formula:

$$\varepsilon_{eff}=1-\frac{\omega_p^2}{\omega \left(\omega + i \frac{\varepsilon_0 a^2 \omega_p^2}{\pi r^2 \sigma} \right)}$$
$$\omega_p^2=\frac{2\pi c^2}{a^2 ln(a/r)}$$

where

- $\omega_p$ is the effective plasma frequency of the medium.
- $\varepsilon_0$ is the vacuum permittivity.
- $a$ is the lattice period.
- $r$ is the radius of the constitutive wires.
- $\sigma$ is the electrical conductivity of the metal.

== Methods and applications ==
Simulation of spoof surface plasmon propagation through a backward-wave metamaterial in the microwave regime

The use of subwavelength structures to induce low-frequency plasmonic excitations was first theorized by John Pendry et al. in 1996; Pendry proposed that a periodic lattice of thin metallic wires with a radius of 1 μm could be used to support surface-bound modes, with a plasma cut-off frequency of 8.2 GHz. In 2004, Pendry et al. extended the approach to metal surfaces that are perforated by holes, terming the artificial SPP excitations as "spoof surface plasmons."

In 2006, terahertz pulse propagation in planar metallic structures with holes were shown via FDTD simulations. Martin-Cano et al. has realized the spatial and temporal modulation of guided terahertz modes via metallic parallelepiped structures, which they termed as "domino plasmons." Designer spoof plasmonic structures were also tailored to improve the performance of terahertz quantum cascade lasers in 2010.

Spoof surface plasmons were proposed as a possible solution for decreasing the crosstalk in microwave integrated circuits, transmission lines and waveguides. In 2013, Ma et al. demonstrated a matched conversion from coplanar waveguide with a characteristic impedance of 50Ω to a spoof-plasmonic structure. In 2014, integration of commercial low-noise amplifier with spoof plasmonic structures was realized; the system reportedly worked from 6 to 20 GHz with a gain around 20 dB. Kianinejad et al. also reported the design of a slow-wave spoof-plasmonic transmission line; conversion from quasi-TEM microstrip modes to TM spoof plasmon modes were also demonstrated.

Khanikaev et al. reported nonreciprocal spoof surface plasmon modes in structured conductor embedded in an asymmetric magneto-optical medium, which results in one-way transmission. Pan et al. observed the rejection of certain spoof plasmon modes with an introduction of electrically resonant metamaterial particles to the spoof plasmonic strip. Localized spoof surface plasmons were also demonstrated for metallic disks in microwave frequencies.

== See also ==
- Photonic crystal
- Plasmonic metamaterial
- Split-ring resonator
- Superlens
- Terahertz metamaterial
- Wood's anomaly
