= Contact lithography =

Lithography technique

Contact lithography, also known as contact printing, is a form of photolithography whereby the image to be printed is obtained by illumination of a photomask in direct contact with a substrate coated with an imaging photoresist layer.

== History ==
The first integrated circuits had features of 200 micrometres which were printed using contact lithography. This technique was popular in the 1960s until it was substituted by proximity printing, where a gap is introduced between the photomask and the substrate. Proximity printing had poorer resolution than contact printing (due to the gap allowing more diffraction to occur) but generated far fewer defects. The resolution was sufficient for down to 2 micrometre production. In 1978, the step-and-repeat projection system appeared. The platform gained wide acceptance due to the reduction of the mask image and is still in use today.

Contact lithography is still commonly practiced today, mainly in applications requiring thick photoresist and/or double-sided alignment and exposure. Advanced 3D packaging, optical devices, and micro-electromechanical systems (MEMS) applications fall into this category. In addition, the contact platform is the same as used in imprint processes.

Recently, two developments have given contact lithography potential for comeback in semiconductor lithography. First, surface plasmon resonance enhancements including the use of silver films as lenses have been demonstrated to give resolution of less than 50 and even 22 nm using wavelengths of 365 and 436 nm. The exotic dispersion relation of surface plasmon has led to the extremely short wavelength, which helps to break the diffraction limit. Second, nanoimprint lithography has already gained popularity outside the semiconductor sector (e.g., hard-drive, biotechnology) and is a candidate for sub-45 nm semiconductor lithography, driving defect reduction practices and uniformity improvement for masks in contact with the substrate. Step-and-flash imprint lithography (SFIL), a popular form of nanoimprint lithography which involves UV curing of the imprint film, essentially uses the same setup as contact lithography.

== Operating principle ==
Generally, a photomask is created, which consists of opaque chromium patterns on a transparent glass plate. The substrate is coated with a thin film of UV-sensitive photoresist. The substrate is then placed underneath the photomask, and pressed into contact with it. The sample is then exposed, during which UV light is shone from the top side of the photomask. Photoresist beneath transparent glass is exposed, and becomes able to be dissolved by a developer, while photoresist under chrome does not receive any UV exposure and will remain intact after developing. The result is the original pattern replicated in the form of photoresist. The pattern may then be permanently transferred into the substrate via any number of microfabrication processes, such as etching or lift-off. A single photomask may be used many times to repeatably reproduce a pattern onto different substrates. A "contact aligner" is generally used to perform this operation, so that previous patterns on a substrate may be aligned to the pattern one wants to expose.

Upon exiting the photomask-photoresist interface, the image-forming light is subject to near-field diffraction as it propagates through the photoresist. Diffraction causes the image to lose contrast with increasing depth into the photoresist. This can be explained by the rapid decay of the highest-order evanescent waves with increasing distance from the photomask-photoresist interface. This effect can be partly mitigated by using thinner photoresist. Contrast enhancements based on plasmon resonances and lensing films have recently been disclosed. The chief advantage of contact lithography is the elimination of the need for complex projection optics between object and image. The resolution limit in today's projection optical systems originates from the finite size of the final imaging lens and its distance from the image plane. More specifically, the projection optics can only capture a limited spatial frequency spectrum from the object (photomask). Contact printing has no such resolution limit but is sensitive to the presence of defects on the mask or on the substrate.

== Types of contact masks ==
There are several types of contact lithography masks.

The standard binary intensity amplitude mask defines dark and light areas where light is blocked or transmitted, respectively. The dark areas are patterned films consisting of chromium or other metal.

The light coupling mask has a corrugated dielectric surface. Each protrusion acts as a localized waveguide. Light is transmitted primarily through the protrusions as a result of this localized guiding effect. Since less contact area is needed, there is less potential for defects.

A hybrid nanoimprint-contact mask utilizes both contact imaging and mechanical imprinting, and has been proposed to optimize imaging of both large and small features simultaneously by eliminating imprint residual layer issues.

Contact masks have traditionally been fairly large (>100 mm), but it is possible that alignment tolerances may require smaller mask sizes to allow stepping between exposures.

As in nanoimprint lithography, the mask needs to have roughly the same feature size as the desired image. Contact masks can be formed directly from other contact masks, or by direct writing (e.g., electron beam lithography).

== Resolution enhancements ==
As noted above, thinner photoresist can help improve image contrast. Reflections from the layer underlying the photoresist also have to be taken into account when absorption and evanescent wave decay are reduced.

The resolution of contact lithography has been predicted to surpass λ/20 periodicity.

The pitch resolution of contact lithography can be readily enhanced by multiple exposures generating feature images between previously exposed features. This is suitable for nested array features, as in memory layouts.

Surface plasmons are collective oscillations of free electrons confined to metal surfaces. They couple strongly to light, forming surface plasmon polaritons. Such excitations effectively behave as waves with very short wavelength (approaching the x-ray regime). By exciting such oscillations under the right conditions, multiple features can appear in between a pair of grooves in the contact mask. The resolution achievable by surface plasmon polariton standing waves on a thin metallic film is <10 nm with a wavelength in the 380-390 nm range using a <20 nm silver film. In addition, deep narrow slits in metallic transmission gratings have been shown to allow resonances that amplify light passing through the slits.

A layer of metal film, has been proposed to act as a 'perfect lens' for amplifying the evanescent waves, resulting in enhanced image contrast. This requires tuning the permittivity to have a negative real part, e.g., silver at 436 nm wavelength. The use of such a lens allows imaging to be achieved with a wide tolerance of distance between mask and photoresist, while achieving extreme resolution enhancement by use of surface plasmon interference, e.g., a half-pitch of 25 nm with 436 nm wavelength. The perfect lens effect is only effective for certain conditions, but allows a resolution roughly equal to the layer thickness. Hence a sub-10 nm resolution appears feasible with this approach as well.

The use of surface plasmon interference gives an edge over other lithography techniques, as the number of mask features can be much less than the number of features in the desired image, making the mask easier to fabricate and inspect. While silver is the most commonly used metal for demonstrating surface plasmons for lithography, aluminum has also been used at 365 nm wavelength.

While these resolution enhancement techniques allow 10 nm features to be contemplated, other factors must be considered for practical implementation. The most fundamental limitation appears to be photoresist roughness, which becomes predominant for shorter sub-wavelength periods where only the zeroth diffraction order is expected to propagate. All the pattern details are in this case conveyed by the evanescent waves, which decay more rapidly for finer resolution. As a result, the photoresist's inherent roughness following development can become more significant than the pattern.

== Defect and contamination issues ==
As with any technology that relies on surface contact, defects are a strong concern. Defects are particularly detrimental to contact lithography in two respects. First, a hard defect can widen the gap between the mask and the substrate. This can easily cause images based on evanescent waves or surface plasmon interference to disappear. Second, smaller, softer defects attached to the metal surface of the mask may not disturb the gap but can still alter the evanescent wave distribution or destroy the surface plasmon interference condition.

Oxidation of the metal surface also destroys plasmon resonance conditions (as the oxide surface is not a metal).
