= Hybrid plasmonic waveguide =

Type of optical waveguide

A hybrid plasmonic waveguide is an optical waveguide that achieves strong light confinement by coupling the light guided by a dielectric waveguide and a plasmonic waveguide. It is formed by separating a medium of high refractive index (usually silicon) from a metal surface (usually gold or silver) by a small gap.

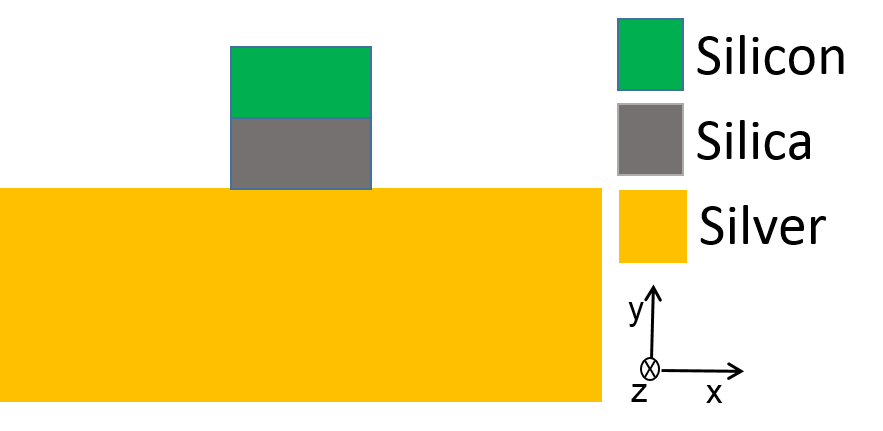
Cross section of hybrid plasmonic waveguide. Power propagates in the z direction.

== History ==
Dielectric waveguides use total internal reflection to confine light in a high index region. They can guide light over a long distance with very low loss, but their light confinement ability is limited by diffraction. Plasmonic waveguides, on the other hand, use surface plasmon to confine light near a metal surface. The light confinement ability of plasmonic waveguides is not limited by diffraction, and, as a result, they can confine light to very small volumes. However, these guides suffer significant propagation loss because of the presence of metal as part of the guiding structure. The aim of designing the hybrid plasmonic waveguide was to combine these two different wave guiding schemes and achieve high light confinement without suffering large loss. Many different variations of this structure have been proposed. Many other types of hybrid plasmonic waveguides have been proposed since then to improve light confinement ability or to reduce fabrication complexity.

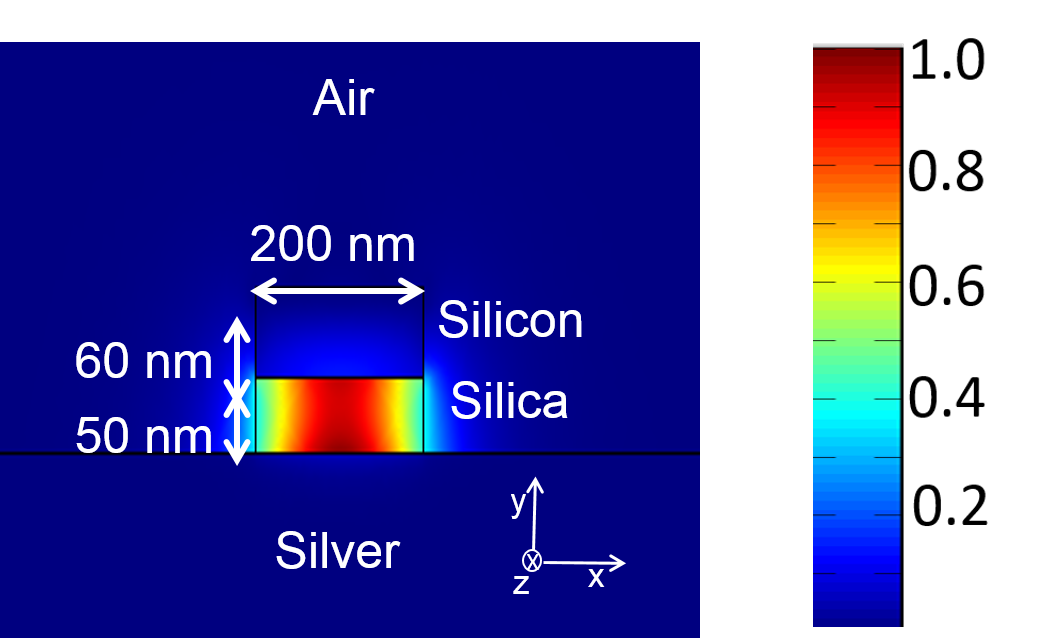
Guided power density in a hybrid plasmonic waveguide. Light propagates in the z-direction

== Principle of operation ==
The operation of the hybrid plasmonic waveguides can be explained using the concept of mode coupling. The most commonly used hybrid plasmonic waveguide consists of a silicon nanowire placed very near a metal surface and separated by a low index region. The silicon waveguide supports dielectric waveguide mode, which is mostly confined in silicon. The metal surface supports surface plasmon, which is confined near the metal surface. When these two structures are brought close to each other, the dielectric waveguide mode supported by the silicon nanowire couples to the surface plasmon mode supported by the metal surface. As a result of this mode coupling, light becomes highly confined in the region between the metal and the high index region (silicon nanowire).

== Applications ==
Hybrid plasmonic waveguide provides large confinement of light at a lower loss compared to many previously reported plasmonic waveguides. It is also compatible with silicon photonics technology, and can be integrated with silicon waveguides on the same chip. Similar to a slot-waveguide, it can also confine light in the low index medium. Combination of these attractive features has stimulated worldwide research activity on the application of this new guiding scheme. Some notable examples of such applications are compact lasers, electro optic modulators, biosensors, polarization control devices, and thermo-optic switches.
