= Plasmonics (journal) =

- Discipline: Plasmonics, nanophotonics
- Language: English
- Edited by: Chris D. Geddes

Publication details
- History: 2006–present
- Publisher: Springer Science+Business Media
- Frequency: Bimonthly
- Impact factor: 4.3 (2024)

Standard abbreviations
- ISO 4: Plasmonics

Indexing
- CODEN: PLASCS
- ISSN: 1557-1955
- LCCN: 2005215699

Links
- Journal homepage; Online access

Plasmonics is a bimonthly peer-reviewed scientific journal covering plasmonics, including the theory of plasmonic metamaterials, fluorescence and surface-enhanced Raman spectroscopy. It is published by Springer Science+Business Media. Its current editor is Chris D. Geddes, Director of the Institute of Fluorescence at the University of Maryland Biotechnology Institute.

== Abstracting and indexing ==
The journal is abstracted and indexed in:

- Science Citation Index Expanded
- Current Contents/Physical, Chemical & Earth Sciences
- EBSCO Academic Search
- EBSCO Discovery Service
- EBSCO Engineering Source
- EBSCO STM Source
- ProQuest Advanced Technologies & Aerospace Database
- ProQuest Central
- ProQuest SciTech Premium Collection
- ProQuest Technology Collection
- ProQuest-ExLibris Primo
- ProQuest-ExLibris Summon

According to the Journal Citation Reports, the journal has a 2024 impact factor of 4.3.
