= Plasmonics =

Use of plasmons for data transmission in circuits

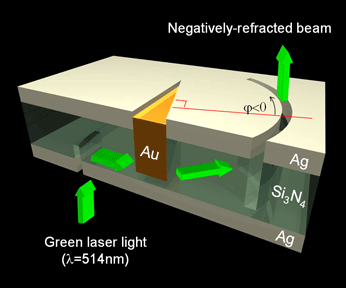
A plasmonic waveguide design to facilitate negative refraction in visible spectrum

Plasmonics or nanoplasmonics refers to the generation, detection, and manipulation of signals at optical frequencies along metal-dielectric interfaces in the nanometer scale. Inspired by photonics, plasmonics follows the trend of miniaturizing optical devices (see also nanophotonics), and finds applications in optical sensing, microscopy, optical communications, and biophotonics.

Magnetoplasmonics is an interdisciplinary field that studies the interactions between magnetism and plasmonics; magnetoplasmonics in confined geometries has the aim to control plasmons through magnetic properties and magnetic phenomena through plasmons.

== Principles ==
Plasmonics typically utilizes surface plasmon polaritons (SPPs), that are coherent electron oscillations travelling together with an electromagnetic wave along the interface between a dielectric (e.g. glass, air) and a metal (e.g. silver, gold). The SPP modes are strongly confined to their supporting interface, giving rise to strong light–matter interactions. In particular, the electron gas in the metal oscillates with the electro-magnetic wave. Because the moving electrons are scattered, ohmic losses in plasmonic signals are generally large, which limits the signal transfer distances to the sub-centimeter range, unless hybrid optoplasmonic light guiding networks, or plasmon gain amplification are used. Besides SPPs, localized surface plasmon modes supported by metal nanoparticles are referred to as plasmonics modes. Both modes are characterized by large momentum values, which enable strong resonant enhancement of the local density of photon states, and can be utilized to enhance weak optical effects of opto-electronic devices.

== Motivation and current challenges ==
An effort is currently being made to integrate plasmonics with electric circuits, or in an electric circuit analog, to combine the size efficiency of electronics with the data capacity of photonic integrated circuits (PIC). While gate lengths of CMOS nodes used for electrical circuits are ever decreasing, the size of conventional PICs is limited by diffraction, thus constituting a barrier for further integration. Plasmonics could bridge this size mismatch between electronic and photonic components. At the same time, photonics and plasmonics can complement each other, since, under the right conditions, optical signals can be converted to SPPs and vice versa.

One of the biggest issues in making plasmonic circuits a feasible reality is the short propagation length of surface plasmons. Typically, surface plasmons travel distances only on the scale of millimeters before damping diminishes the signal. This is largely due to ohmic losses, which become increasingly important the deeper the electric field penetrates into the metal. Researchers are attempting to reduce losses in surface plasmon propagation by examining a variety of materials, geometries, the frequency and their respective properties. New promising low-loss plasmonic materials include metal oxides and nitrides as well as graphene. Key to more design freedom are improved fabrication techniques that can further contribute to reduced losses by reduced surface roughness.

Another foreseeable barrier plasmonic circuits will have to overcome is heat; heat in a plasmonic circuit may or may not exceed the heat generated by complex electronic circuits. It has recently been proposed to reduce heating in plasmonic networks by designing them to support trapped optical vortices, which circulate light powerflow through the inter-particle gaps thus reducing absorption and Ohmic heating, In addition to heat, it is also difficult to change the direction of a plasmonic signal in a circuit without significantly reducing its amplitude and propagation length. One clever solution to the issue of bending the direction of propagation is the use of Bragg mirrors to angle the signal in a particular direction, or even to function as splitters of the signal. Finally, emerging applications of plasmonics for thermal emission manipulation and heat-assisted magnetic recording leverage Ohmic losses in metals to obtain devices with new enhanced functionalities.

== Waveguiding ==
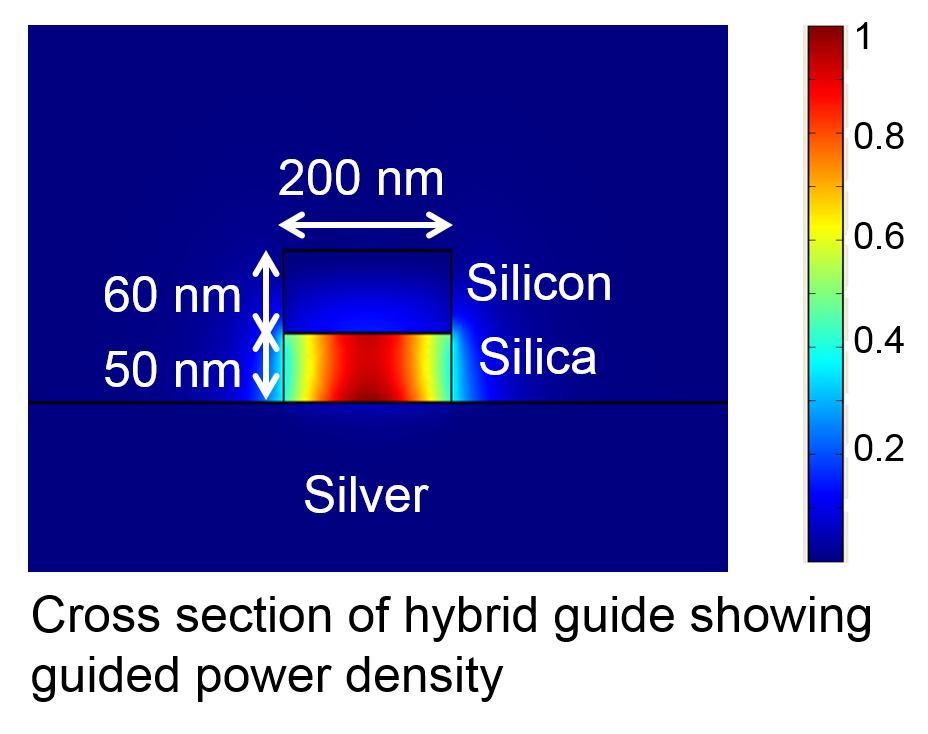
The field distribution on a hybrid plasmonic waveguide

Optimal plasmonic waveguide designs strive to maximize both the confinement and propagation length of surface plasmons within a plasmonic circuit. Surface plasmon polaritons are characterized by a complex wave vector, with components parallel and perpendicular to the metal-dielectric interface. The imaginary part of the wave vector component is inversely proportional to the SPP propagation length, while its real part defines the SPP confinement. The SPP dispersion characteristics depend on the dielectric constants of the materials comprising the waveguide. The propagation length and confinement of the surface plasmon polariton wave are inversely related. Therefore, stronger confinement of the mode typically results in shorter propagation lengths. The construction of a practical and usable surface plasmon circuit is heavily dependent on a compromise between propagation and confinement. Maximizing both confinement and propagation length helps mitigate the drawbacks of choosing propagation length over confinement and vice versa. Multiple types of waveguides have been created in pursuit of a plasmonic circuit with strong confinement and sufficient propagation length. Some of the most common types include insulator-metal-insulator (IMI), metal-insulator-metal (MIM), dielectric loaded surface plasmon polariton (DLSPP), gap plasmon polariton (GPP), channel plasmon polariton (CPP), wedge surface plasmon polariton (wedge), and hybrid opto-plasmonic waveguides and networks. Dissipation losses accompanying SPP propagation in metals can be mitigated by gain amplification or by combining them into hybrid networks with photonic elements such as fibers and coupled-resonator waveguides. This design can result in the previously mentioned hybrid plasmonic waveguide, which exhibits subwavelength mode on a scale of one-tenth of the diffraction limit of light, along with an acceptable propagation length.

== Coupling ==
The input and output ports of a plasmonic circuit will receive and send optical signals, respectively. To do this, coupling and decoupling of the optical signal to the surface plasmon is necessary. The dispersion relation for the surface plasmon lies entirely below the dispersion relation for light, which means that for coupling to occur additional momentum should be provided by the input coupler to achieve the momentum conservation between incoming light and surface plasmon polariton waves launched in the plasmonic circuit. There are several solutions to this, including using dielectric prisms, gratings, or localized scattering elements on the surface of the metal to help induce coupling by matching the momenta of the incident light and the surface plasmons. After a surface plasmon has been created and sent to a destination, it can then be converted into an electrical signal. This can be achieved by using a photodetector in the metal plane, or decoupling the surface plasmon into freely propagating light that can then be converted into an electrical signal.

Alternatively, the signal can be out-coupled into a propagating mode of an optical fiber or waveguide.

== Active devices ==
The progress made in surface plasmons over the last 50 years has led to the development in various types of devices, both active and passive. A few of the most prominent areas of active devices are optical, thermo-optical, and electro-optical. All-optical devices have shown the capacity to become a viable source for information processing, communication, and data storage when used as a modulator. In one instance, the interaction of two light beams of different wavelengths was demonstrated by converting them into co-propagating surface plasmons via cadmium selenide quantum dots. Electro-optical devices have combined aspects of both optical and electrical devices in the form of a modulator as well. Specifically, electro-optic modulators have been designed using evanescently coupled resonant metal gratings and nanowires that rely on long-range surface plasmons (LRSP). Likewise, thermo-optic devices, which contain a dielectric material whose refractive index changes with variation in temperature, have also been used as interferometric modulators of SPP signals in addition to directional-coupler switches. Some thermo-optic devices have been shown to utilize LRSP waveguiding along gold stripes that are embedded in a polymer and heated by electrical signals as a means for modulation and directional-coupler switches. Another potential field lies in the use of spasers in areas such as nanoscale lithography, probing, and microscopy.

== Passive devices ==
Although active components play an important role in the use of plasmonic circuitry, passive circuits are just as integral and, surprisingly, not trivial to make. Many passive elements such as prisms, lenses, and beam splitters can be implemented in a plasmonic circuit, however fabrication at the nano scale has proven difficult and has adverse effects. Significant losses can occur due to decoupling in situations where a refractive element with a different refractive index is used. However, some steps have been taken to minimize losses and maximize compactness of the photonic components. One such step relies on the use of Bragg reflectors, or mirrors composed of a succession of planes to steer a surface plasmon beam. When optimized, Bragg reflectors can reflect nearly 100% of the incoming power. Another method used to create compact photonic components relies on CPP waveguides as they have displayed strong confinement with acceptable losses less than 3 dB within telecommunication wavelengths.

Maximizing loss and compactness with regards to the use of passive devices, as well as active devices, creates more potential for the use of plasmonic circuits.

== See also ==
- Nanophotonics
- Metamaterials
- Spoof surface plasmon
