= Localized surface plasmon =

Electron oscillations in a nanoparticle

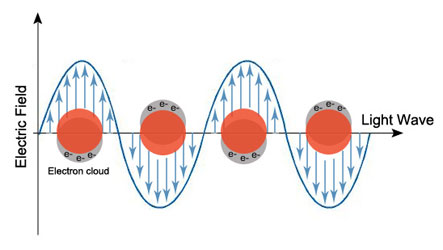
Light incident on a metal nanoparticle causes the conduction band electrons to oscillate. This is the localized surface plasmon.

A localized surface plasmon (LSP) is the result of the confinement of a surface plasmon in a nanoparticle of size comparable to or smaller than the wavelength of light used to excite the plasmon. When a small spherical metallic nanoparticle is irradiated by light, the oscillating electric field causes the conduction electrons to oscillate coherently. When the electron cloud is displaced relative to its original position, a restoring force arises from Coulombic attraction between electrons and nuclei. This force causes the electron cloud to oscillate. The oscillation frequency is determined by the density of electrons, the effective electron mass, and the size and shape of the charge distribution. The LSP has two important effects: electric fields near the particle's surface are greatly enhanced and the particle's optical absorption has a maximum at the plasmon resonant frequency. Surface plasmon resonance can also be tuned based on the shape of the nanoparticle. The plasmon frequency can be related to the metal dielectric constant. The enhancement falls off quickly with distance from the surface and, for noble metal nanoparticles, the resonance occurs at visible wavelengths. Localized surface plasmon resonance creates brilliant colors in metal colloidal solutions.

For metals like silver and gold, the oscillation frequency is also affected by the electrons in d-orbitals. Silver is a popular choice in plasmonics, which studies the effect of coupling light to charges, because it can support a surface plasmon over a wide range of wavelengths (300-1200 nm), and its peak absorption wavelength is easily changed. For instance, the peak absorption wavelength of triangular silver nanoparticles was altered by changing the corner sharpness of the triangles. It underwent a blue-shift as corner sharpness of the triangles decreased. Additionally, peak absorption wavelength underwent a red-shift as a larger amount of HAuCl_{4} was added and porosity of the particles increased. For semiconductor nanoparticles, the maximum optical absorption is often in the near-infrared and mid-infrared region.

== Propagating surface plasmons ==
Localized surface plasmons are distinct from propagating surface plasmons. In localized surface plasmons, the electron cloud oscillates collectively. In propagating surface plasmons, the surface plasmon propagates back and forth between the ends of the structure. Propagating surface plasmons also need to have at least one dimension that is close to or longer than the wavelength of incident light. The waves created in propagating surface plasmons can also be tuned by controlling the geometry of the metal nanostructure.

== Characterization and study ==
A goal of plasmonics is to understand and manipulate surface plasmons at the nano-scale, so characterization of surface plasmons is important. Some techniques frequently used to characterize surface plasmons are dark-field microscopy, UV-vis-NIR spectroscopy, and surface-enhanced Raman scattering (SERS). With dark-field microscopy, it is possible to monitor the spectrum of an individual metal nanostructure as the incident light polarization, wavelength, or variations in the dielectric environment is changed.

== Applications ==
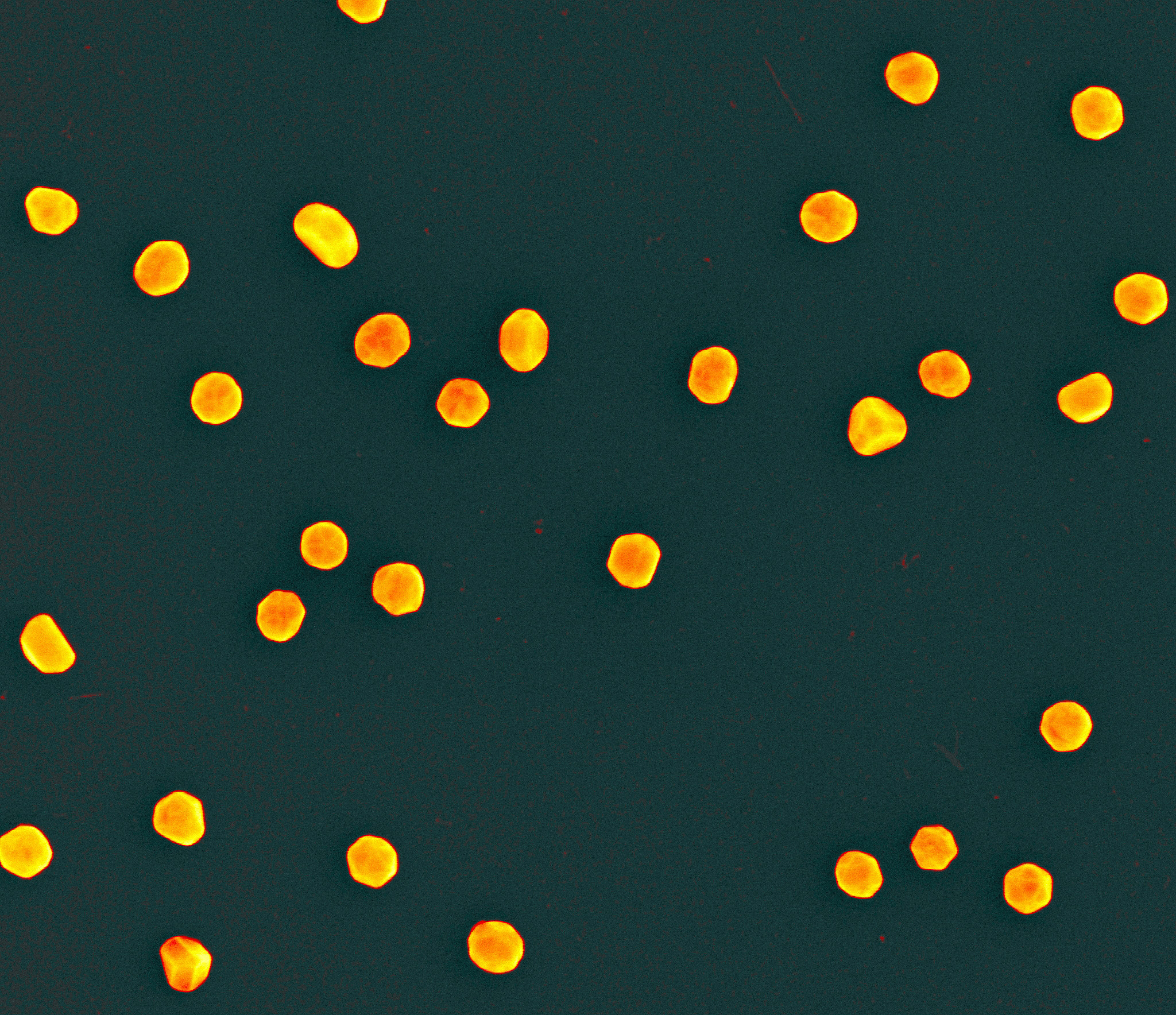
Gold nanoparticles, pictured here under scanning electron microscope, exhibit strong LSP resonances.

The plasmon resonant frequency is highly sensitive to the refractive index of the environment; a change in refractive index results in a shift in the resonant frequency. As the resonant frequency is easy to measure, this allows LSP nanoparticles to be used for nanoscale sensing applications, such as being implemented in nanoantenna devices. Also, nanoparticles exhibiting strong LSP properties, such as gold nanorods and gold nanocages, enhance the signal in surface plasmon resonance sensing. Nanostructures exhibiting LSP resonances are used to enhance signals in modern analytical techniques based on spectroscopy. Other applications that rely on efficient light to heat generation in the nanoscale are heat-assisted magnetic recording (HAMR), photothermal cancer therapy, and thermophotovoltaics. So far, high-efficiency applications using plasmonics have not been realized due to the high Ohmic losses inside metals especially in the optical spectral range (visible and NIR).

Additionally, surface plasmons have been used to create super lenses, invisibility cloaks, and to improve quantum computing. Another interesting area of research in plasmonics is the ability to turn plasmons "on" and "off" via modification of another molecule. The ability to turn plasmons on and off has important consequences for increasing sensitivity in detection methods. Recently, a supramolecular chromophore was coupled with a metal nanostructure. This interaction changed the localized surface plasmon resonance properties of the silver nanostructure by increasing the absorption intensity.

== See also ==
- Surface plasmon resonance
- Surface-enhanced Raman spectroscopy
- Nanoparticle
- Tip-enhanced Raman spectroscopy
