= Superlens =

Type of transmissive optical device

A superlens, or super lens, is a lens which uses metamaterials to achieve super-resolution imaging and go beyond the diffraction limit. The diffraction limit is a feature of conventional lenses and microscopes that limits the fineness of their image resolution depending on the radiation wavelength and the numerical aperture (NA) of the objective lens. Many lens designs have been proposed that go beyond the diffraction limit in some way, but constraints and obstacles face each of them.

== History ==
In 1873 Ernst Abbe reported that conventional lenses are incapable of capturing some fine details of any given image. The superlens is intended to capture such details. This limitation of conventional lenses has inhibited progress in the biological sciences. This is because a virus or DNA molecule cannot be resolved with the highest powered conventional microscopes. This limitation extends to the minute processes of cellular proteins moving alongside microtubules of a living cell in their natural environments. Additionally, computer chips and the interrelated microelectronics continue to be manufactured at progressively smaller scales. This requires specialized optical equipment, which is also limited because these use conventional lenses. Hence, the principles governing a superlens show that it has potential for imaging DNA molecules, cellular protein processes, and aiding in the manufacture of even smaller computer chips and microelectronics.

Conventional lenses capture only the propagating light waves. These are waves that travel from a light source or an object to a lens, or the human eye. This can alternatively be studied as the far field. In contrast, a superlens captures propagating light waves and waves that stay on top of the surface of an object, which, alternatively, can be studied as both the far field and the near field.

In the early 20th century the term "superlens" was used by Dennis Gabor to describe something quite different: a compound lenslet array system.

== Theory ==
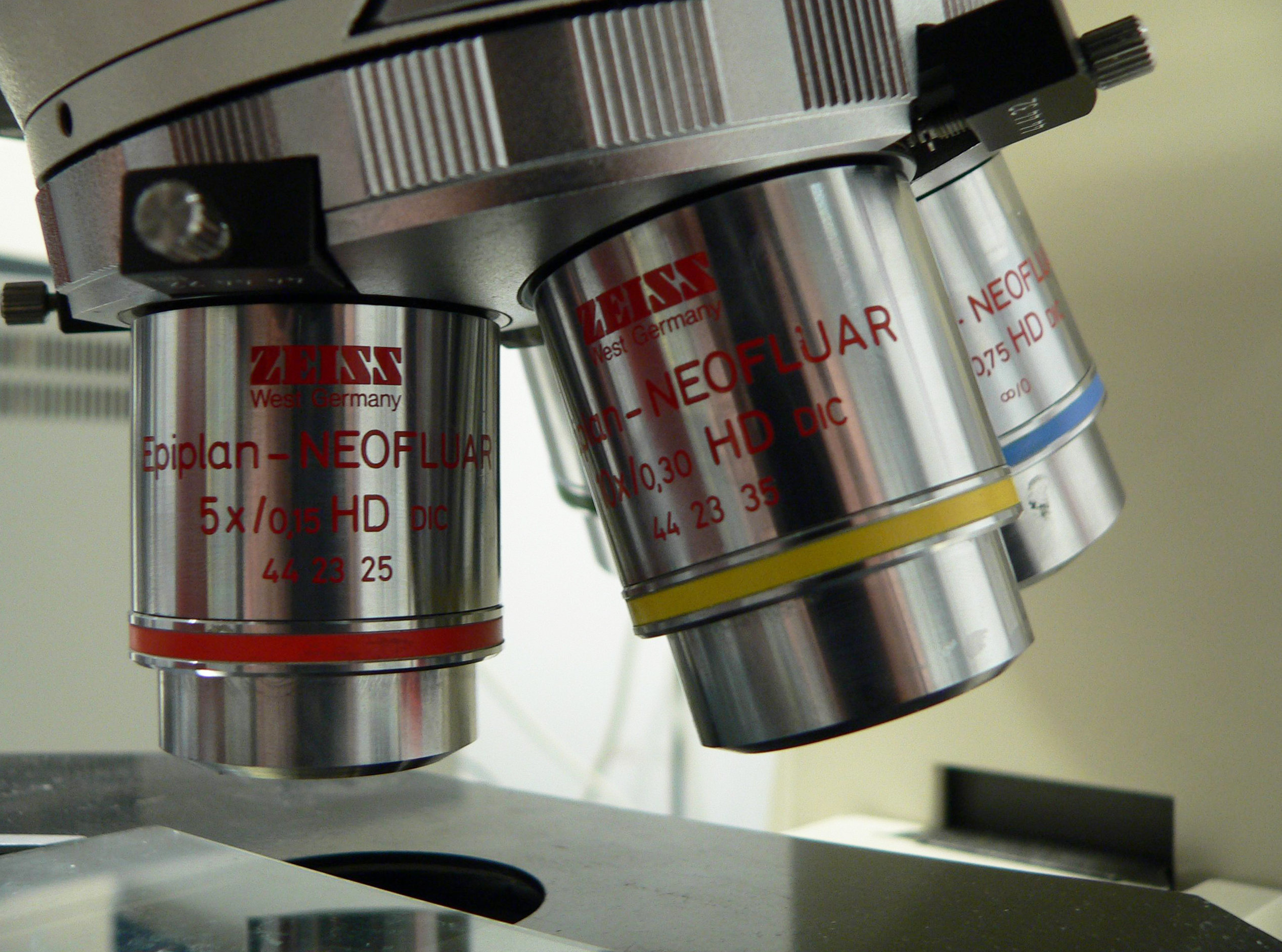
The binocular microscope is a conventional optical system. Spatial resolution is confined by a diffraction limit that is a little above 200 nanometers.

=== Image formation ===
Schematic depictions and images of commonly used metallic nanoprobes that can be used to see a sample in nanometer resolution. Notice that the tips of the three nanoprobes are 100 nanometers.

An image of an object can be defined as a tangible or visible representation of the features of that object. A requirement for image formation is interaction with fields of electromagnetic radiation. Furthermore, the level of feature detail, or image resolution, is limited to a length of a wave of radiation. For example, with optical microscopy, image production and resolution depends on the length of a wave of visible light. However, with a superlens, this limitation may be removed, and a new class of image generated.

Electron beam lithography can overcome this resolution limit. Optical microscopy, on the other hand cannot, being limited to some value just above 200 nanometers. However, new technologies combined with optical microscopy are beginning to allow increased feature resolution (see sections below).

One definition of being constrained by the resolution barrier, is a resolution cut off at half the wavelength of light. The visible spectrum has a range that extends from 390 nanometers to 750 nanometers. Green light, half way in between, is around 500 nanometers. Microscopy takes into account parameters such as lens aperture, distance from the object to the lens, and the refractive index of the observed material. This combination defines the resolution cutoff, or microscopy optical limit, which tabulates to 200 nanometers. Therefore, conventional lenses, which literally construct an image of an object by using "ordinary" light waves, discard information that produces very fine, and minuscule details of the object that are contained in evanescent waves. These dimensions are less than 200 nanometers. For this reason, conventional optical systems, such as microscopes, have been unable to accurately image very small, nanometer-sized structures or nanometer-sized organisms in vivo, such as individual viruses, or DNA molecules.

The limitations of standard optical microscopy (bright-field microscopy) lie in three areas:

- The technique can only image dark or strongly refracting objects effectively.
- Diffraction limits the object, or cell's, resolution to approximately 200 nanometers.
- Out-of-focus light from points outside the focal plane reduces image clarity.

=== Conventional lens ===
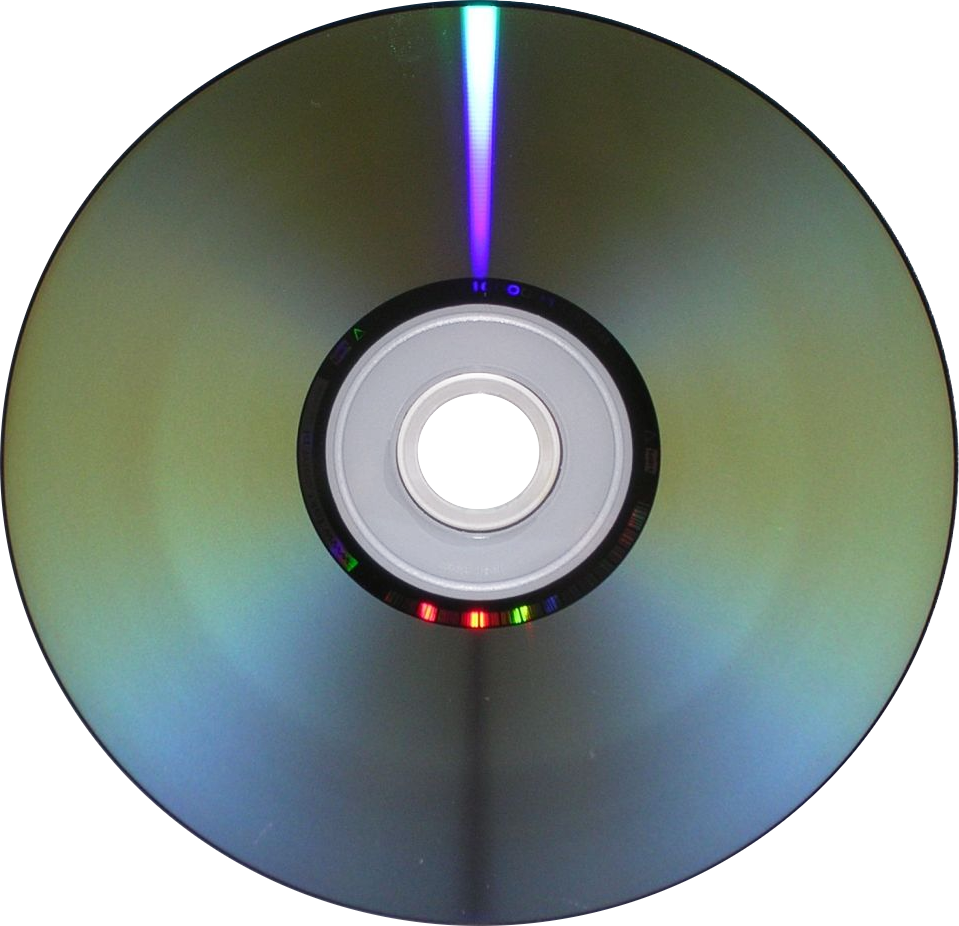
DVD (digital versatile disc). A laser is employed for data transfer.

The conventional glass lens is pervasive throughout our society and in the sciences. It is one of the fundamental tools of optics simply because it interacts with various wavelengths of light. At the same time, the wavelength of light can be analogous to the width of a pencil used to draw the ordinary images. The limit intrudes in all kinds of ways. For example, the laser used in a digital video system cannot read details from a DVD that are smaller than the wavelength of the laser. This limits the storage capacity of DVDs.

Thus, when an object emits or reflects light there are two types of electromagnetic radiation associated with this phenomenon. These are the near field radiation and the far field radiation. As implied by its description, the far field escapes beyond the object. It is then easily captured and manipulated by a conventional glass lens. However, useful (nanometer-sized) resolution details are not observed, because they are hidden in the near field. They remain localized, staying much closer to the light emitting object, unable to travel, and unable to be captured by the conventional lens. Controlling the near field radiation, for high resolution, can be accomplished with a new class of materials not easily obtained in nature. These are unlike familiar solids, such as crystals, which derive their properties from atomic and molecular units. The new material class, termed metamaterials, obtains its properties from its artificially larger structure. This has resulted in novel properties, and novel responses, which allow for details of images that surpass the limitations imposed by the wavelength of light.

=== Subwavelength imaging ===
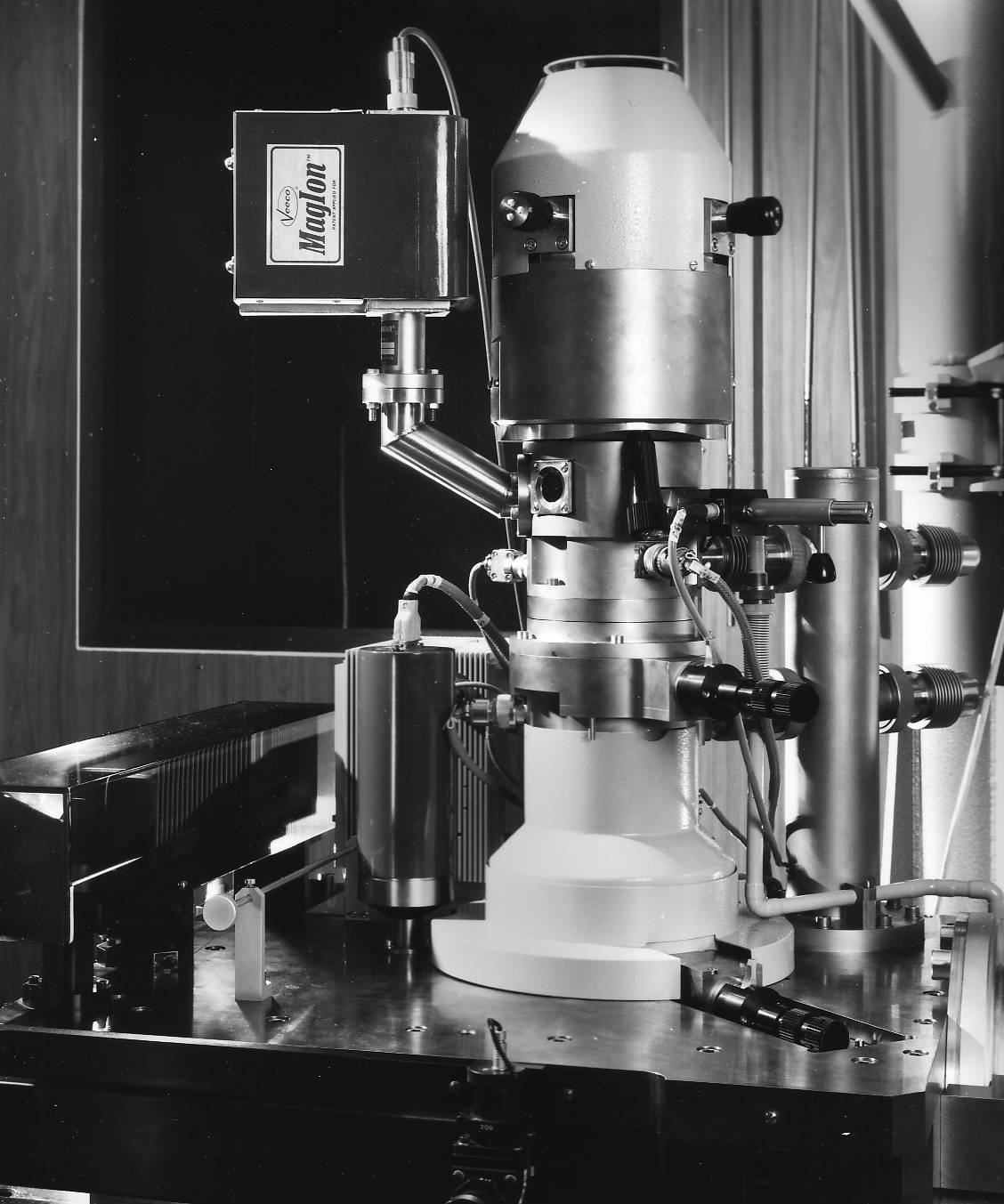
The "Electrocomposeur" was an electron-beam lithography machine (electron microscope) designed for mask writing. It was developed in the early 1970s and deployed in the mid-1970s.

Live biological cells in particular generally lack sufficient contrast to be studied successfully, because the internal structures of the cell are mostly colorless and transparent. The most common way to increase contrast is to stain the different structures with selective dyes, but often this involves killing and fixing the sample. Staining may also introduce artifacts, apparent structural details that are caused by the processing of the specimen and are thus not a legitimate feature of the specimen.

This has led to the desire to view live biological cell interactions in a real time, natural environment, and the need for subwavelength imaging. Subwavelength imaging can be defined as optical microscopy with the ability to see details of an object or organism below the wavelength of visible light (see discussion in the above sections). In other words, to have the capability to observe, in real time, below 200 nanometers. Optical microscopy is a non-invasive technique and technology because everyday light is the transmission medium. Imaging below the optical limit in optical microscopy (subwavelength) can be engineered for the cellular level, and nanometer level in principle.

For example, in 2007 a technique was demonstrated where a metamaterials-based lens coupled with a conventional optical lens could manipulate visible light to see (nanoscale) patterns that were too small to be observed with an ordinary optical microscope. This has potential applications not only for observing a whole living cell, or for observing cellular processes, such as how proteins and fats move in and out of cells. In the technology domain, it could be used to improve the first steps of photolithography and nanolithography, essential for manufacturing ever smaller computer chips.

Focusing at subwavelength has become a unique imaging technique which allows visualization of features on the viewed object which are smaller than the wavelength of the photons in use. A photon is the minimum unit of light. While previously thought to be physically impossible, subwavelength imaging has been made possible through the development of metamaterials. This is generally accomplished using a layer of metal such as gold or silver a few atoms thick, which acts as a superlens, or by means of 1D and 2D photonic crystals. There is a subtle interplay between propagating waves, evanescent waves, near field imaging and far field imaging discussed in the sections below.

=== Early subwavelength imaging ===
Metamaterial lenses (Superlenses) are able to reconstruct nanometer sized images by producing a negative refractive index in each instance. This compensates for the swiftly decaying evanescent waves. Prior to metamaterials, numerous other techniques had been proposed and even demonstrated for creating super-resolution microscopy. As far back as 1928, Irish physicist Edward Hutchinson Synge, is given credit for conceiving and developing the idea for what would ultimately become near-field scanning optical microscopy.

In 1974 proposals for two-dimensional fabrication techniques were presented. These proposals included contact imaging to create a pattern in relief, photolithography, electron-beam lithography, X-ray lithography, or ion bombardment, on an appropriate planar substrate. The shared technological goals of the metamaterial lens and the variety of lithography aim to optically resolve features having dimensions much smaller than that of the vacuum wavelength of the exposing light. In 1981 two different techniques of contact imaging of planar (flat) submicroscopic metal patterns with blue light (400 nm) were demonstrated. One demonstration resulted in an image resolution of 100 nm and the other a resolution of 50 to 70 nm.

In 1995, John M. Guerra combined a transparent grating having 50 nm lines and spaces (the "metamaterial") with a conventional microscope immersion objective. The resulting "superlens" resolved a silicon sample also having 50 nm lines and spaces, far beyond the classical diffraction limit imposed by the illumination having 650 nm wavelength in air.

Since at least 1998 near field optical lithography was designed to create nanometer-scale features. Research on this technology continued as the first experimentally demonstrated negative index metamaterial came into existence in 2000–2001. The effectiveness of electron-beam lithography was also being researched at the beginning of the new millennium for nanometer-scale applications. Imprint lithography was shown to have desirable advantages for nanometer-scaled research and technology.

Advanced deep UV photolithography can now offer sub-100 nm resolution, yet the minimum feature size and spacing between patterns are determined by the diffraction limit of light. Its derivative technologies such as evanescent near-field lithography, near-field interference lithography, and phase-shifting mask lithography were developed to overcome the diffraction limit.

In the year 2000, John Pendry proposed using a metamaterial lens to achieve nanometer-scaled imaging for focusing below the wavelength of light.

=== Analysis of the diffraction limit ===
The original problem of the perfect lens: The general expansion of an EM field emanating from a source consists of both propagating waves and near-field or evanescent waves. An example of a 2-D line source with an electric field which has S-polarization will have plane waves consisting of propagating and evanescent components, which advance parallel to the interface. As both the propagating and the smaller evanescent waves advance in a direction parallel to the medium interface, evanescent waves decay in the direction of propagation. Ordinary (positive index) optical elements can refocus the propagating components, but the exponentially decaying inhomogeneous components are always lost, leading to the diffraction limit for focusing to an image.

A superlens is a lens which is capable of subwavelength imaging, allowing for magnification of near field rays. Conventional lenses have a resolution on the order of one wavelength due to the so-called diffraction limit. This limit hinders imaging very small objects, such as individual atoms, which are much smaller than the wavelength of visible light. A superlens is able to beat the diffraction limit. An example is the initial lens described by Pendry, which uses a slab of material with a negative index of refraction as a flat lens. In theory, a perfect lens would be capable of perfect focus – meaning that it could perfectly reproduce the electromagnetic field of the source plane at the image plane.

==== The diffraction limit as restriction on resolution ====
The performance limitation of conventional lenses is due to the diffraction limit. Following Pendry (2000), the diffraction limit can be understood as follows. Consider an object and a lens placed along the z-axis so the rays from the object are traveling in the +z direction. The field emanating from the object can be written in terms of its angular spectrum method, as a superposition of plane waves:

$$E(x,y,z,t)=\sum_{k_x,k_y} A(k_x,k_y) e^{i\left(k_z z + k_y y + k_x x - \omega t\right)},$$

where $k_z$ is a function of $k_x, k_y$:

$$k_z=\sqrt{\frac{\omega^2}{c^2} - \left(k_x^2 + k_y^2\right)}.$$

Only the positive square root is taken as the energy is going in the +z direction. All of the components of the angular spectrum of the image for which $k_z$ is real are transmitted and re-focused by an ordinary lens. However, if

$$k_x^2 + k_y^2 > \frac{\omega^2}{c^2},$$

then $k_z$ becomes imaginary, and the wave is an evanescent wave, whose amplitude decays as the wave propagates along the z axis. This results in the loss of the high-angular-frequency components of the wave, which contain information about the high-frequency (small-scale) features of the object being imaged. The highest resolution that can be obtained can be expressed in terms of the wavelength:

$$k_\text{max} \approx \frac{\omega}{c}=\frac{2 \pi}{\lambda},$$

$$\Delta x_\text{min} \approx \lambda.$$

A superlens overcomes the limit. A Pendry-type superlens has an index of n=−1 (ε=−1, μ=−1), and in such a material, transport of energy in the +z direction requires the z component of the wave vector to have opposite sign:

$$k'_z=-\sqrt{\frac{\omega^2}{c^2} - \left(k_x^2 + k_y^2\right)}.$$

For large angular frequencies, the evanescent wave now grows, so with proper lens thickness, all components of the angular spectrum can be transmitted through the lens undistorted. There are no problems with conservation of energy, as evanescent waves carry none in the direction of growth: the Poynting vector is oriented perpendicularly to the direction of growth. For traveling waves inside a perfect lens, the Poynting vector points in direction opposite to the phase velocity.

==== Effects of negative index of refraction ====
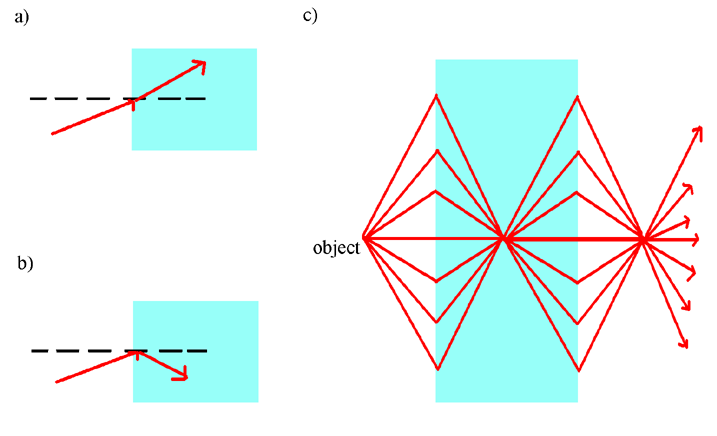
a) When a wave strikes a positive refraction index material from a vacuum. b) When a wave strikes a negative-refraction-index material from a vacuum. c) When an object is placed in front of an object with n=−1, light from it is refracted so it focuses once inside the lens and once outside. This allows subwavelength imaging.

Normally, when a wave passes through the interface of two materials, the wave appears on the opposite side of the normal. However, if the interface is between a material with a positive index of refraction and another material with a negative index of refraction, the wave will appear on the same side of the normal. Pendry's idea of a perfect lens is a flat material where n=−1. Such a lens allows near-field rays, which normally decay due to the diffraction limit, to focus once within the lens and once outside the lens, allowing subwavelength imaging.

== Development and construction ==
Superlens construction was at one time thought to be impossible. In 2000, Pendry claimed that a simple slab of left-handed material would do the job. The experimental realization of such a lens took, however, some more time, because it is not that easy to fabricate metamaterials with both negative permittivity and permeability. Indeed, no such material exists naturally and construction of the required metamaterials is non-trivial. Furthermore, it was shown that the parameters of the material are extremely sensitive (the index must equal −1); small deviations make the subwavelength resolution unobservable. Due to the resonant nature of metamaterials, on which many (proposed) implementations of superlenses depend, metamaterials are highly dispersive. The sensitive nature of the superlens to the material parameters causes superlenses based on metamaterials to have a limited usable frequency range. This initial theoretical superlens design consisted of a metamaterial that compensated for wave decay and reconstructs images in the near field. Both propagating and evanescent waves could contribute to the resolution of the image.

Pendry also suggested that a lens having only one negative parameter would form an approximate superlens, provided that the distances involved are also very small and provided that the source polarization is appropriate. For visible light this is a useful substitute, since engineering metamaterials with a negative permeability at the frequency of visible light is difficult. Metals are then a good alternative as they have negative permittivity (but not negative permeability). Pendry suggested using silver due to its relatively low loss at the predicted wavelength of operation (356 nm). In 2003 Pendry's theory was first experimentally demonstrated at RF/microwave frequencies. In 2005, two independent groups verified Pendry's lens at UV range, both using thin layers of silver illuminated with UV light to produce "photographs" of objects smaller than the wavelength. Negative refraction of visible light was experimentally verified in an yttrium orthovanadate (YVO_{4}) bicrystal in 2003.

It was discovered that a simple superlens design for microwaves could use an array of parallel conducting wires. This structure was shown to be able to improve the resolution of MRI imaging.

In 2004, the first superlens with a negative refractive index provided resolution three times better than the diffraction limit and was demonstrated at microwave frequencies. In 2005, the first near field superlens was demonstrated by N.Fang et al., but the lens did not rely on negative refraction. Instead, a thin silver film was used to enhance the evanescent modes through surface plasmon coupling. Almost at the same time Melville and Blaikie succeeded with a near field superlens. Other groups followed. Two developments in superlens research were reported in 2008. In the second case, a metamaterial was formed from silver nanowires which were electrochemically deposited in porous aluminium oxide. The material exhibited negative refraction. The imaging performance of such isotropic negative dielectric constant slab lenses were also analyzed with respect to the slab material and thickness. Subwavelength imaging opportunities with planar uniaxial anisotropic lenses, where the dielectric tensor components are of the opposite sign, have also been studied as a function of the structure parameters.

The superlens has not yet been demonstrated at visible or near-infrared frequencies. Furthermore, as dispersive materials, these are limited to functioning at a single wavelength. Proposed solutions are metal–dielectric composites (MDCs) and multilayer lens structures. The multi-layer superlens appears to have better subwavelength resolution than the single layer superlens. Losses are less of a concern with the multi-layer system, but so far it appears to be impractical because of impedance mis-match.

While the evolution of nanofabrication techniques continues to push the limits in fabrication of nanostructures, surface roughness remains an inevitable source of concern in the design of nano-photonic devices. The impact of this surface roughness on the effective dielectric constants and subwavelength image resolution of multilayer metal–insulator stack lenses has also been studied.

All-dielectric subwavelength metasurface focusing lens operating in the near infrared has been demonstrated by the Shalaev group in collaboration with the Raytheon team. This lens is currently used in Raytheon defense system products.

=== Perfect lenses ===
When the world is observed through conventional lenses, the sharpness of the image is determined by and limited to the wavelength of light. Around the year 2000, a slab of negative index metamaterial was theorized to create a lens with capabilities beyond conventional (positive index) lenses. Pendry proposed that a thin slab of negative refractive metamaterial might overcome known problems with common lenses to achieve a "perfect" lens that would focus the entire spectrum, both the propagating as well as the evanescent spectra.

A slab of silver was proposed as the metamaterial. More specifically, such silver thin film can be regarded as a metasurface. As light moves away (propagates) from the source, it acquires an arbitrary phase. Through a conventional lens the phase remains consistent, but the evanescent waves decay exponentially. In the flat metamaterial DNG slab, normally decaying evanescent waves are contrarily amplified. Furthermore, as the evanescent waves are now amplified, the phase is reversed.

Therefore, a type of lens was proposed, consisting of a metal film metamaterial. When illuminated near its plasma frequency, the lens could be used for superresolution imaging that compensates for wave decay and reconstructs images in the near-field. In addition, both propagating and evanescent waves contribute to the resolution of the image.

Pendry suggested that left-handed slabs allow "perfect imaging" if they are completely lossless, impedance matched, and their refractive index is −1 relative to the surrounding medium. Theoretically, this would be a breakthrough in that the optical version resolves objects as minuscule as nanometers across. Pendry predicted that Double negative metamaterials (DNG) with a refractive index of n=−1, can act, at least in principle, as a "perfect lens" allowing imaging resolution which is limited not by the wavelength, but rather by material quality.

==== Other studies concerning the perfect lens ====
Further research demonstrated that Pendry's theory behind the perfect lens was not exactly correct. The analysis of the focusing of the evanescent spectrum (equations 13–21 in reference) was flawed. In addition, this applies to only one (theoretical) instance, and that is one particular medium that is lossless, nondispersive and the constituent parameters are defined as:

ε(ω) / ε_{0}=μ(ω) / μ_{0}=−1, which in turn results in a negative refraction of n=−1

However, the final intuitive result of this theory that both the propagating and evanescent waves are focused, resulting in a converging focal point within the slab and another convergence (focal point) beyond the slab turned out to be correct.

If the DNG metamaterial medium has a large negative index or becomes lossy or dispersive, Pendry's perfect lens effect cannot be realized. As a result, the perfect lens effect does not exist in general. According to FDTD simulations at the time (2001), the DNG slab acts like a converter from a pulsed cylindrical wave to a pulsed beam. Furthermore, in reality (in practice), a DNG medium must be and is dispersive and lossy, which can have either desirable or undesirable effects, depending on the research or application. Consequently, Pendry's perfect lens effect is inaccessible with any metamaterial designed to be a DNG medium.

Another analysis, in 2002, of the perfect lens concept showed it to be in error while using the lossless, dispersionless DNG as the subject. This analysis mathematically demonstrated that subtleties of evanescent waves, restriction to a finite slab and absorption had led to inconsistencies and divergencies that contradict the basic mathematical properties of scattered wave fields. For example, this analysis stated that absorption, which is linked to dispersion, is always present in practice, and absorption tends to transform amplified waves into decaying ones inside this medium (DNG).

A third analysis of Pendry's perfect lens concept, published in 2003, used the recent demonstration of negative refraction at microwave frequencies as confirming the viability of the fundamental concept of the perfect lens. In addition, this demonstration was thought to be experimental evidence that a planar DNG metamaterial would refocus the far field radiation of a point source. However, the perfect lens would require significantly different values for permittivity, permeability, and spatial periodicity than the demonstrated negative refractive sample.

This study agrees that any deviation from conditions where ε=μ=−1 results in the normal, conventional, imperfect image that degrades exponentially i.e., the diffraction limit. The perfect lens solution in the absence of losses is again, not practical, and can lead to paradoxical interpretations.

It was determined that although resonant surface plasmons are undesirable for imaging, these turn out to be essential for recovery of decaying evanescent waves. This analysis discovered that metamaterial periodicity has a significant effect on the recovery of types of evanescent components. In addition, achieving subwavelength resolution is possible with current technologies. Negative refractive indices have been demonstrated in structured metamaterials. Such materials can be engineered to have tunable material parameters, and so achieve the optimal conditions. Losses up to microwave frequencies can be minimized in structures utilizing superconducting elements. Furthermore, consideration of alternate structures may lead to configurations of left-handed materials that can achieve subwavelength focusing. Such structures were being studied at the time.

An effective approach for the compensation of losses in metamaterials, called plasmon injection scheme, has been recently proposed. The plasmon injection scheme has been applied theoretically to imperfect negative index flat lenses with reasonable material losses and in the presence of noise as well as hyperlenses. It has been shown that even imperfect negative index flat lenses assisted with plasmon injection scheme can enable subdiffraction imaging of objects which is otherwise not possible due to the losses and noise. Although plasmon injection scheme was originally conceptualized for plasmonic metamaterials, the concept is general and applicable to all types of electromagnetic modes. The main idea of the scheme is the coherent superposition of the lossy modes in the metamaterial with an appropriately structured external auxiliary field. This auxiliary field accounts for the losses in the metamaterial, hence effectively reducing the losses experienced by the signal beam or object field in the case of a metamaterial lens. The plasmon injection scheme can be implemented either physically or equivalently through a deconvolution post-processing method. However, the physical implementation has shown to be more effective than the deconvolution. Physical construction of convolution and selective amplification of the spatial frequencies within a narrow bandwidth are the keys to the physical implementation of the plasmon injection scheme. This loss compensation scheme is ideally suited especially for metamaterial lenses since it does not require gain medium, nonlinearity, or any interaction with phonons. Experimental demonstration of the plasmon injection scheme has not yet been shown partly because the theory is rather new.

=== Near-field imaging with magnetic wires ===
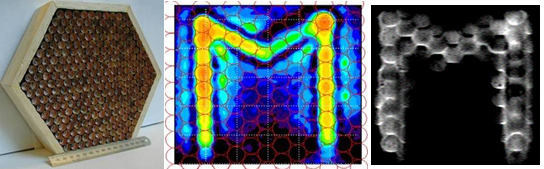
A prism composed of high performance Swiss rolls which behaves as a magnetic faceplate, transferring a magnetic field distribution faithfully from the input to the output face

Pendry's theoretical lens was designed to focus both propagating waves and the near-field evanescent waves. From permittivity "ε" and magnetic permeability "μ" an index of refraction "n" is derived. The index of refraction determines how light is bent on traversing from one material to another. In 2003, it was suggested that a metamaterial constructed with alternating, parallel, layers of n=−1 materials and n=+1 materials, would be a more effective design for a metamaterial lens. It is an effective medium made up of a multi-layer stack, which exhibits birefringence, n_{2}=∞, n_{x}=0. The effective refractive indices are then perpendicular and parallel, respectively.

Like a conventional lens, the z-direction is along the axis of the roll. The resonant frequency (w_{0}) – close to 21.3 MHz – is determined by the construction of the roll. Damping is achieved by the inherent resistance of the layers and the lossy part of permittivity.

Simply put, as the field pattern is transferred from the input to the output face of a slab, so the image information is transported across each layer. This was experimentally demonstrated. To test the two-dimensional imaging performance of the material, an antenna was constructed from a pair of anti-parallel wires in the shape of the letter M. This generated a line of magnetic flux, so providing a characteristic field pattern for imaging. It was placed horizontally, and the material, consisting of 271 Swiss rolls tuned to 21.5 MHz, was positioned on top of it. The material does indeed act as an image transfer device for the magnetic field. The shape of the antenna is faithfully reproduced in the output plane, both in the distribution of the peak intensity, and in the "valleys" that bound the M.

A consistent characteristic of the very near (evanescent) field is that the electric and magnetic fields are largely decoupled. This allows for nearly independent manipulation of the electric field with the permittivity and the magnetic field with the permeability.

Furthermore, this is highly anisotropic system. Therefore, the transverse (perpendicular) components of the EM field which radiate the material, that is the wavevector components k_{x} and k_{y}, are decoupled from the longitudinal component k_{z}. So, the field pattern should be transferred from the input to the output face of a slab of material without degradation of the image information.

=== Optical superlens with silver metamaterial ===
In 2003, a group of researchers showed that optical evanescent waves would be enhanced as they passed through a silver metamaterial lens. This was referred to as a diffraction-free lens. Although a coherent, high-resolution, image was not intended, nor achieved, regeneration of the evanescent field was experimentally demonstrated.

By 2003 it was known for decades that evanescent waves could be enhanced by producing excited states at the interface surfaces. However, the use of surface plasmons to reconstruct evanescent components was not tried until Pendry's recent proposal (see "Perfect lens" above). By studying films of varying thickness it has been noted that a rapidly growing transmission coefficient occurs, under the appropriate conditions. This demonstration provided direct evidence that the foundation of superlensing is solid, and suggested the path that will enable the observation of superlensing at optical wavelengths.

In 2005, a coherent, high-resolution image was produced (based on the 2003 results). A thinner slab of silver (35 nm) was better for sub–diffraction-limited imaging, which results in one-sixth of the illumination wavelength. This type of lens was used to compensate for wave decay and reconstruct images in the near-field. Prior attempts to create a working superlens used a slab of silver that was too thick.

Objects were imaged as small as 40 nm across. In 2005 the imaging resolution limit for optical microscopes was at about one tenth the diameter of a red blood cell. With the silver superlens this results in a resolution of one hundredth of the diameter of a red blood cell.

Conventional lenses, whether man-made or natural, create images by capturing the propagating light waves all objects emit and then bending them. The angle of the bend is determined by the index of refraction and has always been positive until the fabrication of artificial negative index materials. Objects also emit evanescent waves that carry details of the object, but are unobtainable with conventional optics. Such evanescent waves decay exponentially and thus never become part of the image resolution, an optics threshold known as the diffraction limit. Breaking this diffraction limit, and capturing evanescent waves are critical to the creation of a 100-percent perfect representation of an object.

In addition, conventional optical materials suffer a diffraction limit because only the propagating components are transmitted (by the optical material) from a light source. The non-propagating components, the evanescent waves, are not transmitted. Moreover, lenses that improve image resolution by increasing the index of refraction are limited by the availability of high-index materials, and point by point subwavelength imaging of electron microscopy also has limitations when compared to the potential of a working superlens. Scanning electron and atomic force microscopes are now used to capture detail down to a few nanometers. However, such microscopes create images by scanning objects point by point, which means they are typically limited to non-living samples, and image capture times can take up to several minutes.

With current optical microscopes, scientists can only make out relatively large structures within a cell, such as its nucleus and mitochondria. With a superlens, optical microscopes could one day reveal the movements of individual proteins traveling along the microtubules that make up a cell's skeleton, the researchers said. Optical microscopes can capture an entire frame with a single snapshot in a fraction of a second. With superlenses this opens up nanoscale imaging to living materials, which can help biologists better understand cell structure and function in real time.

Advances of magnetic coupling in the THz and infrared regime provided the realization of a possible metamaterial superlens. However, in the near field, the electric and magnetic responses of materials are decoupled. Therefore, for transverse magnetic (TM) waves, only the permittivity needed to be considered. Noble metals, then become natural selections for superlensing because negative permittivity is easily achieved.

By designing the thin metal slab so that the surface current oscillations (the surface plasmons) match the evanescent waves from the object, the superlens is able to substantially enhance the amplitude of the field. Superlensing results from the enhancement of evanescent waves by surface plasmons.

The key to the superlens is its ability to significantly enhance and recover the evanescent waves that carry information at very small scales. This enables imaging well below the diffraction limit. No lens is yet able to completely reconstitute all the evanescent waves emitted by an object, so the goal of a 100-percent perfect image will persist. However, many scientists believe that a true perfect lens is not possible because there will always be some energy absorption loss as the waves pass through any known material. In comparison, the superlens image is substantially better than the one created without the silver superlens.

=== 50-nm flat silver layer ===
In February 2004, an electromagnetic radiation focusing system, based on a negative index metamaterial plate, accomplished subwavelength imaging in the microwave domain. This showed that obtaining separated images at much less than the wavelength of light is possible. Also, in 2004, a silver layer was used for sub-micrometre near-field imaging. Super high resolution was not achieved, but this was intended. The silver layer was too thick to allow significant enhancements of evanescent field components.

In early 2005, feature resolution was achieved with a different silver layer. Though this was not an actual image, it was intended. Dense feature resolution down to 250 nm was produced in a 50 nm thick photoresist using illumination from a mercury lamp. Using simulations (FDTD), the study noted that resolution improvements could be expected for imaging through silver lenses, rather than another method of near field imaging.

Building on this prior research, super resolution was achieved at optical frequencies using a 50 nm flat silver layer. The capability of resolving an image beyond the diffraction limit, for far-field imaging, is defined here as superresolution.

The image fidelity is much improved over earlier results of the previous experimental lens stack. Imaging of sub-micrometre features has been greatly improved by using thinner silver and spacer layers, and by reducing the surface roughness of the lens stack. The ability of the silver lenses to image the gratings has been used as the ultimate resolution test, as there is a concrete limit for the ability of a conventional (far field) lens to image a periodic object – in this case the image is a diffraction grating. For normal-incidence illumination the minimum spatial period that can be resolved with wavelength λ through a medium with refractive index n is λ/n. Zero contrast would therefore be expected in any (conventional) far-field image below this limit, no matter how good the imaging resist might be.

The (super) lens stack here results in a computational result of a diffraction-limited resolution of 243 nm. Gratings with periods from 500 nm down to 170 nm are imaged, with the depth of the modulation in the resist reducing as the grating period reduces. All of the gratings with periods above the diffraction limit (243 nm) are well resolved. The key results of this experiment are super-imaging of the sub-diffraction limit for 200 nm and 170 nm periods. In both cases the gratings are resolved, even though the contrast is diminished, but this gives experimental confirmation of Pendry's superlensing proposal.

=== Negative index GRIN lenses ===
Gradient Index (GRIN) – The larger range of material response available in metamaterials should lead to improved GRIN lens design. In particular, since the permittivity and permeability of a metamaterial can be adjusted independently, metamaterial GRIN lenses can presumably be better matched to free space. The GRIN lens is constructed by using a slab of NIM with a variable index of refraction in the y direction, perpendicular to the direction of propagation z.

=== Far-field superlens ===
In 2005, a group proposed a theoretical way to overcome the near-field limitation using a new device termed a far-field superlens (FSL), which is a properly designed periodically corrugated metallic slab-based superlens.

Imaging was experimentally demonstrated in the far field, taking the next step after near-field experiments. The key element is termed as a far-field superlens (FSL) which consists of a conventional superlens and a nanoscale coupler.

==== Focusing beyond the diffraction limit with far-field time reversal ====
An approach is presented for subwavelength focusing of microwaves using both a time-reversal mirror placed in the far field and a random distribution of scatterers placed in the near field of the focusing point.

=== Hyperlens ===
Once capability for near-field imaging was demonstrated, the next step was to project a near-field image into the far-field. This concept, including technique and materials, is dubbed "hyperlens".

In May 2012, calculations showed an ultraviolet (1200–1400 THz) hyperlens can be created using alternating layers of boron nitride and graphene.

In February 2018, a mid-infrared (~5–25 μm) hyperlens was introduced, made from a variably doped indium arsenide multilayer, which offered drastically lower losses.

The capability of a metamaterial-hyperlens for sub-diffraction-limited imaging is shown below.

==== Sub-diffraction imaging in the far field ====
With conventional optical lenses, the far field is a limit that is too distant for evanescent waves to arrive intact. When imaging an object, this limits the optical resolution of lenses to the order of the wavelength of light. These non-propagating waves carry detailed information in the form of high spatial resolution, and overcome limitations. Therefore, projecting image details, normally limited by diffraction into the far field does require recovery of the evanescent waves.

In essence steps leading up to this investigation and demonstration was the employment of an anisotropic metamaterial with a hyperbolic dispersion. The effect was such that ordinary evanescent waves propagate along the radial direction of the layered metamaterial. On a microscopic level the large spatial frequency waves propagate through coupled surface plasmon excitations between the metallic layers.

In 2007, just such an anisotropic metamaterial was employed as a magnifying optical hyperlens. The hyperlens consisted of a curved periodic stack of thin silver and alumina (at 35 nanometers thick) deposited on a half-cylindrical cavity, and fabricated on a quartz substrate. The radial and tangential permittivities have different signs.

Upon illumination, the scattered evanescent field from the object enters the anisotropic medium and propagates along the radial direction. Combined with another effect of the metamaterial, a magnified image at the outer diffraction limit-boundary of the hyperlens occurs. Once the magnified feature is larger than (beyond) the diffraction limit, it can then be imaged with a conventional optical microscope, thus demonstrating magnification and projection of a sub-diffraction-limited image into the far field.

The hyperlens magnifies the object by transforming the scattered evanescent waves into propagating waves in the anisotropic medium, projecting a spatial resolution high-resolution image into the far field. This type of metamaterials-based lens, paired with a conventional optical lens is therefore able to reveal patterns too small to be discerned with an ordinary optical microscope. In one experiment, the lens was able to distinguish two 35-nanometer lines etched 150 nanometers apart. Without the metamaterials, the microscope showed only one thick line.

In a control experiment, the line pair object was imaged without the hyperlens. The line pair could not be resolved because of the diffraction limit of the (optical) aperture was limited to 260 nm. Because the hyperlens supports the propagation of a very broad spectrum of wave vectors, it can magnify arbitrary objects with sub-diffraction-limited resolution.

Although this work appears to be limited by being only a cylindrical hyperlens, the next step is to design a spherical lens. That lens will exhibit three-dimensional capability. Near-field optical microscopy uses a tip to scan an object. In contrast, this optical hyperlens magnifies an image that is sub-diffraction-limited. The magnified sub-diffraction image is then projected into the far field.

The optical hyperlens shows a notable potential for applications, such as real-time biomolecular imaging and nanolithography. Such a lens could be used to watch cellular processes that have been impossible to see. Conversely, it could be used to project an image with extremely fine features onto a photoresist as a first step in photolithography, a process used to make computer chips. The hyperlens also has applications for DVD technology.

In 2010, a spherical hyperlens for two dimensional imaging at visible frequencies was demonstrated experimentally. The spherical hyperlens was based on silver and titanium oxide in alternating layers and had strong anisotropic hyperbolic dispersion allowing super-resolution with visible spectrum. The resolution was 160 nm in the visible spectrum. It will enable biological imaging at the cellular and DNA level, with a strong benefit of magnifying sub-diffraction resolution into far-field.

=== Super-imaging in the visible frequency range ===
In 2007 researchers demonstrated super imaging using materials, which create negative refractive index and lensing is achieved in the visible range.

Continual improvements in optical microscopy are needed to keep up with the progress in nanotechnology and microbiology. Advancement in spatial resolution is key. Conventional optical microscopy is limited by a diffraction limit which is on the order of 200 nanometers (wavelength). This means that viruses, proteins, DNA molecules and many other samples are hard to observe with a regular (optical) microscope. The lens previously demonstrated with negative refractive index material, a thin planar superlens, does not provide magnification beyond the diffraction limit of conventional microscopes. Therefore, images smaller than the conventional diffraction limit will still be unavailable.

Another approach achieving super-resolution at visible wavelength is recently developed spherical hyperlens based on silver and titanium oxide alternating layers. It has strong anisotropic hyperbolic dispersion allowing super-resolution with converting evanescent waves into propagating waves. This method is non-fluorescence based super-resolution imaging, which results in real-time imaging without any reconstruction of images and information.

=== Super resolution far-field microscopy techniques ===
By 2008 the diffraction limit has been surpassed and lateral imaging resolutions of 20 to 50 nm have been achieved by several "super-resolution" far-field microscopy techniques, including stimulated emission depletion (STED) and its related RESOLFT (reversible saturable optically linear fluorescent transitions) microscopy; saturated structured illumination microscopy (SSIM); stochastic optical reconstruction microscopy (STORM); photoactivated localization microscopy (PALM); and other methods using similar principles.

=== Cylindrical superlens via coordinate transformation ===
This began with a proposal by Pendry, in 2003. Magnifying the image required a new design concept in which the surface of the negatively refracting lens is curved. One cylinder touches another cylinder, resulting in a curved cylindrical lens which reproduced the contents of the smaller cylinder in magnified but undistorted form outside the larger cylinder. Coordinate transformations are required to curve the original perfect lens into the cylindrical, lens structure.

This was followed by a 36-page conceptual and mathematical proof in 2005, that the cylindrical superlens works in the quasistatic regime. The debate over the perfect lens is discussed first.

In 2007, a superlens utilizing coordinate transformation was again the subject. However, in addition to image transfer other useful operations were discussed; translation, rotation, mirroring and inversion as well as the superlens effect. Furthermore, elements that perform magnification are described, which are free from geometric aberrations, on both the input and output sides while utilizing free space sourcing (rather than waveguide). These magnifying elements also operate in the near and far field, transferring the image from near field to far field.

The cylindrical magnifying superlens was experimentally demonstrated in 2007 by two groups, Liu et al. and Smolyaninov et al.

=== Nano-optics with metamaterials ===
==== Nanohole array as a lens ====
Work in 2007 demonstrated that a quasi-periodic array of nanoholes, in a metal screen, were able to focus the optical energy of a plane wave to form subwavelength spots (hot spots). The distances for the spots was a few tens of wavelengths on the other side of the array, or, in other words, opposite the side of the incident plane wave. The quasi-periodic array of nanoholes functioned as a light concentrator.

In June 2008, this was followed by the demonstrated capability of an array of quasi-crystal nanoholes in a metal screen. More than concentrating hot spots, an image of the point source is displayed a few tens of wavelengths from the array, on the other side of the array (the image plane). Also this type of array exhibited a 1 to 1 linear displacement, – from the location of the point source to its respective, parallel, location on the image plane. In other words, from x to x + δx. For example, other point sources were similarly displaced from x' to x' + δx', from x^ to x^ + δx^, and from x^^ to x^^ + δx^^, and so on. Instead of functioning as a light concentrator, this performs the function of conventional lens imaging with a 1 to 1 correspondence, albeit with a point source.

However, resolution of more complicated structures can be achieved as constructions of multiple point sources. The fine details, and brighter image, that are normally associated with the high numerical apertures of conventional lenses can be reliably produced. Notable applications for this technology arise when conventional optics is not suitable for the task at hand. For example, this technology is better suited for X-ray imaging, or nano-optical circuits, and so forth.

==== Nanolens ====
In 2010, a nano-wire array prototype, described as a three-dimensional (3D) metamaterial-nanolens, consisting of bulk nanowires deposited in a dielectric substrate was fabricated and tested.

The metamaterial nanolens was constructed of millions of nanowires at 20 nanometers in diameter. These were precisely aligned and a packaged configuration was applied. The lens is able to depict a clear, high-resolution image of nano-sized objects because it uses both normal propagating EM radiation, and evanescent waves to construct the image. Super-resolution imaging was demonstrated over a distance of 6 times the wavelength (λ), in the far-field, with a resolution of at least λ/4. This is a significant improvement over previous research and demonstration of other near field and far field imaging, including nanohole arrays discussed below.

==== Light transmission properties of holey metal films ====
2009–12. The light transmission properties of holey metal films in the metamaterial limit, where the unit length of the periodic structures is much smaller than the operating wavelength, are analyzed theoretically.

==== Transporting an image through a subwavelength hole ====
Theoretically it appears possible to transport a complex electromagnetic image through a tiny subwavelength hole with diameter considerably smaller than the diameter of the image, without losing the subwavelength details.

=== Nanoparticle imaging – quantum dots ===
When observing the complex processes in a living cell, significant processes (changes) or details are easy to overlook. This can more easily occur when watching changes that take a long time to unfold and require high-spatial-resolution imaging. However, recent research offers a solution to scrutinize activities that occur over hours or even days inside cells, potentially solving many of the mysteries associated with molecular-scale events occurring in these tiny organisms.

A joint research team, working at the National Institute of Standards and Technology (NIST) and the National Institute of Allergy and Infectious Diseases (NIAID), has discovered a method of using nanoparticles to illuminate the cellular interior to reveal these slow processes. Nanoparticles, thousands of times smaller than a cell, have a variety of applications. One type of nanoparticle called a quantum dot glows when exposed to light. These semiconductor particles can be coated with organic materials, which are tailored to be attracted to specific proteins within the part of a cell a scientist wishes to examine.

Notably, quantum dots last longer than many organic dyes and fluorescent proteins that were previously used to illuminate the interiors of cells. They also have the advantage of monitoring changes in cellular processes while most high-resolution techniques like electron microscopy only provide images of cellular processes frozen at one moment. Using quantum dots, cellular processes involving the dynamic motions of proteins, are observable (elucidated).

The research focused primarily on characterizing quantum dot properties, contrasting them with other imaging techniques. In one example, quantum dots were designed to target a specific type of human red blood cell protein that forms part of a network structure in the cell's inner membrane. When these proteins cluster together in a healthy cell, the network provides mechanical flexibility to the cell so it can squeeze through narrow capillaries and other tight spaces. But when the cell gets infected with the malaria parasite, the structure of the network protein changes.

Because the clustering mechanism is not well understood, it was decided to examine it with the quantum dots. If a technique could be developed to visualize the clustering, then the progress of a malaria infection could be understood, which has several distinct developmental stages.

Research efforts revealed that as the membrane proteins bunch up, the quantum dots attached to them are induced to cluster themselves and glow more brightly, permitting real time observation as the clustering of proteins progresses. More broadly, the research discovered that when quantum dots attach themselves to other nanomaterials, the dots' optical properties change in unique ways in each case. Furthermore, evidence was discovered that quantum dot optical properties are altered as the nanoscale environment changes, offering greater possibility of using quantum dots to sense the local biochemical environment inside cells.

Some concerns remain over toxicity and other properties. However, the overall findings indicate that quantum dots could be a valuable tool to investigate dynamic cellular processes.

The abstract from the related published research paper states (in part): Results are presented regarding the dynamic fluorescence properties of bioconjugated nanocrystals or quantum dots (QDs) in different chemical and physical environments. A variety of QD samples was prepared and compared: isolated individual QDs, QD aggregates, and QDs conjugated to other nanoscale materials...

== See also ==
- Acoustic metamaterials
- History of metamaterials
- Metamaterial absorber
- Metamaterial antennas
- Metamaterial cloaking
- Negative index metamaterials
- Nonlinear metamaterials
- Photonic crystal
- Photonic metamaterials
- Plasmonic metamaterials
- Seismic metamaterials
- Split-ring resonator
- Terahertz metamaterials
- Theories of cloaking
- Transformation optics
- Tunable metamaterials
- Plasmonic lens

Academic journals

- Metamaterials (journal)

Metamaterials books

- Metamaterials Handbook
- Metamaterials: Physics and Engineering Explorations

Metamaterials scientists

- Nader Engheta
- Ulf Leonhardt
- John Pendry
- Vladimir Shalaev
- David R. Smith
- Sergei Tretyakov (scientist)
- Richard W. Ziolkowski
