= Plasmon =

Quasiparticle of charge oscillations in condensed matter

In physics, a plasmon is a quantum of plasma oscillation. Just as light (an optical oscillation) consists of photons, the plasma oscillation consists of plasmons. The plasmon can be considered as a quasiparticle since it arises from the quantization of plasma oscillations, just like phonons are quantizations of mechanical vibrations. Thus, plasmons are collective (a discrete number) oscillations of the free electron gas density. For example, at optical frequencies, plasmons can couple with a photon to create another quasiparticle called a plasmon polariton.

The field of study and manipulation of plasmons is called plasmonics.

== Introduction ==
=== Derivation ===
The plasmon was initially proposed in 1952 by David Pines and David Bohm and was shown to arise from a Hamiltonian for the long-range electron-electron correlations.

Since plasmons are the quantization of classical plasma oscillations, most of their properties can be derived directly from Maxwell's equations.

=== Explanation ===
Plasmons can be described in the classical picture as an oscillation of electron density with respect to the fixed positive ions in a metal. To visualize a plasma oscillation, imagine a cube of metal placed in an external electric field pointing to the right. Electrons will move to the left side (uncovering positive ions on the right side) until they cancel the field inside the metal. If the electric field is removed, the electrons move to the right, repelled by each other and attracted to the positive ions left bare on the right side. They oscillate back and forth at the plasma frequency until the energy is lost in some kind of resistance or damping. Plasmons are a quantization of this kind of oscillation.

=== Role ===
Plasmons play an important role in the optical properties of metals and semiconductors. Frequencies of light below the plasma frequency are reflected by a material because the electrons in the material screen the electric field of the light. Light of frequencies above the plasma frequency is transmitted by a material because the electrons in the material cannot respond fast enough to screen it. In most metals, the plasma frequency is in the ultraviolet, making them shiny (reflective) in the visible range. Some metals, such as copper and gold, have electronic interband transitions in the visible range, whereby specific light energies (and therefore colors) are absorbed, yielding their distinct color.

In semiconductors, the valence electron plasmon frequency is usually in the deep ultraviolet, while their electronic interband transitions are in the visible range, similarly to copper and gold, yielding their distinct color and reflectiveness. It has been shown that the plasmon frequency may occur in the mid-infrared and near-infrared region when semiconductors are in the form of nanoparticles with heavy doping.

The plasmon energy can often be estimated in the free electron model as
$$E_{\rm p} = \hbar \sqrt{\frac{ne^2}{m\varepsilon_0}} = \hbar\omega_{\rm p},$$
where $E_{\rm p}$ is the radiant energy, $\omega_{\rm p}$ the plasmon frequency, $n$ is the conduction electron density, $e$ is the elementary charge, $m$ is the electron mass, $\varepsilon_0$ the permittivity of free space, and $\hbar$ the reduced Planck constant.

== Surface plasmons ==
Surface plasmons are those plasmons that are confined to surfaces and that interact strongly with light resulting in a polariton. They occur at the interface of a material exhibiting positive real part of their relative permittivity, i.e. dielectric constant, (e.g. vacuum, air, glass and other dielectrics) and a material whose real part of permittivity is negative at the given frequency of light, typically a metal or heavily doped semiconductors. In addition to opposite sign of the real part of the permittivity, the magnitude of the real part of the permittivity in the negative permittivity region should typically be larger than the magnitude of the permittivity in the positive permittivity region, otherwise the light is not bound to the surface (i.e. the surface plasmons do not exist) as shown in the famous book by Heinz Raether. At visible wavelengths of light, e.g. 632.8 nm wavelength provided by a He-Ne laser, interfaces supporting surface plasmons are often formed by metals like silver or gold (negative real part permittivity) in contact with dielectrics such as air or silicon dioxide. The particular choice of materials can have a drastic effect on the degree of light confinement and propagation distance due to losses. Surface plasmons can also exist on interfaces other than flat surfaces, such as particles, or rectangular strips, v-grooves, cylinders, and other structures. Many structures have been investigated due to the capability of surface plasmons to confine light below the diffraction limit of light. One simple structure that was investigated was a multilayer system of copper and nickel. Mladenovic et al. report the use of the multilayers as if its one plasmonic material. Oxidation of the copper layers is prevented with the addition of the nickel layers. It is an easy path the integration of plasmonics to use copper as the plasmonic material because it is the most common choice for metallic plating along with nickel. The multilayers serve as a diffractive grating for the incident light. Up to 40 percent transmission can be achieved at normal incidence with the multilayer system depending on the thickness ratio of copper to nickel. Therefore, the use of already popular metals in a multilayer structure prove to be solution for plasmonic integration.

Surface plasmons can play a role in surface-enhanced Raman spectroscopy and in explaining anomalies in diffraction from metal gratings (Wood's anomaly), among other things. Surface plasmon resonance is used by biochemists to study the mechanisms and kinetics of ligands binding to receptors (i.e. a substrate binding to an enzyme). Multi-parametric surface plasmon resonance can be used not only to measure molecular interactions but also nanolayer properties or structural changes in the adsorbed molecules, polymer layers or graphene, for instance.

Surface plasmons may also be observed in the X-ray emission spectra of metals. A dispersion relation for surface plasmons in the X-ray emission spectra of metals has been derived (Harsh and Agarwal).

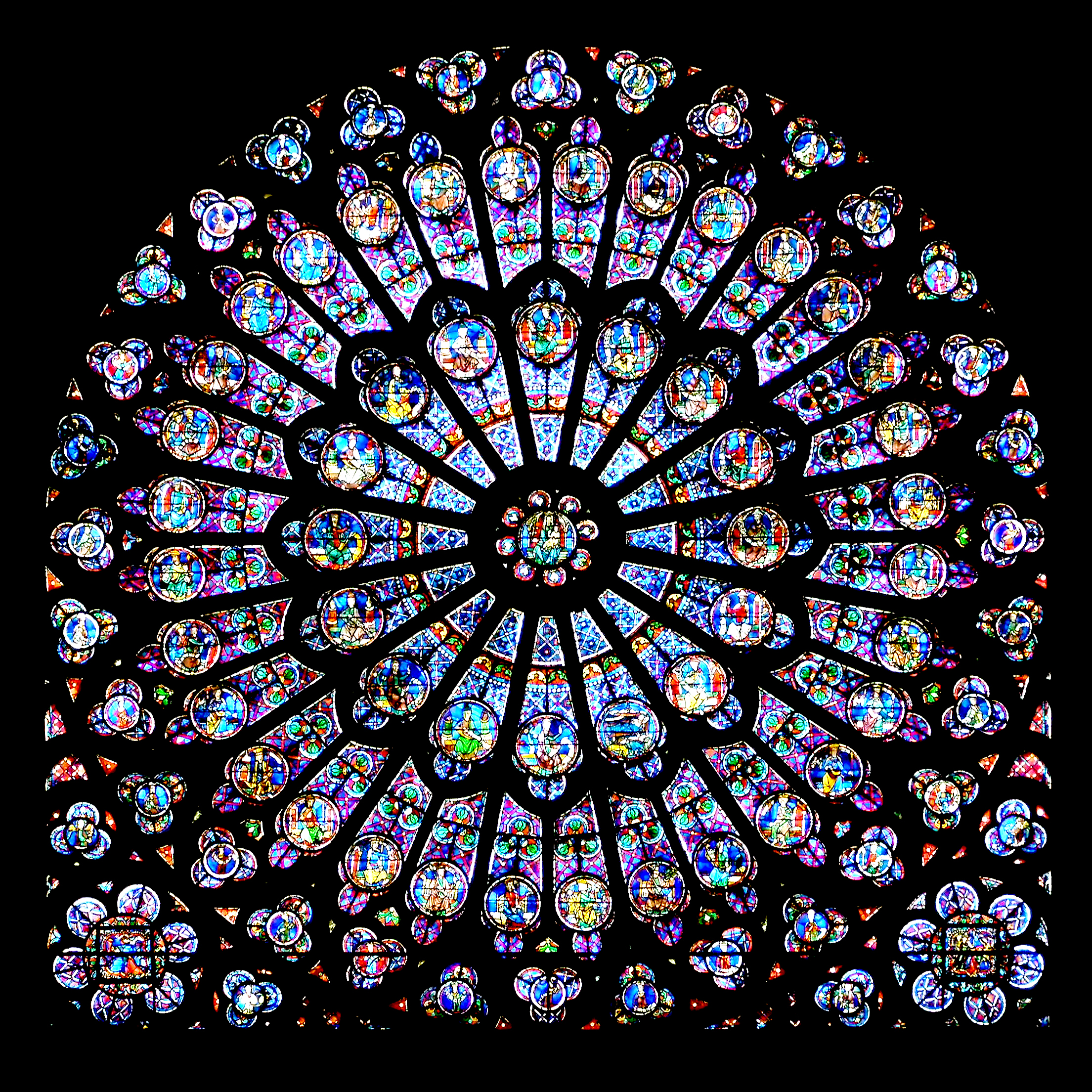
Gothic stained glass rose window of Notre-Dame de Paris. Some colors were achieved by colloids of gold nano-particles.

More recently surface plasmons have been used to control colors of materials. This is possible since controlling the particle's shape and size determines the types of surface plasmons that can be coupled into and propagate across it. This, in turn, controls the interaction of light with the surface. These effects are illustrated by the historic stained glass which adorn medieval cathedrals. Some stained glass colors are produced by metal nanoparticles of a fixed size which interact with the optical field to give glass a vibrant red color. In modern science, these effects have been engineered for both visible light and microwave radiation. Much research goes on first in the microwave range because at this wavelength, material surfaces and samples can be produced mechanically because the patterns tend to be on the order of a few centimeters. The production of optical range surface plasmon effects involves making surfaces which have features <400 nm. This is much more difficult and has only recently become possible to do in any reliable or available way.

Recently, graphene has also been shown to accommodate surface plasmons, observed via near field infrared optical microscopy techniques and infrared spectroscopy. Potential applications of graphene plasmonics mainly addressed the terahertz to midinfrared frequencies, such as optical modulators, photodetectors, biosensors.

== Possible applications ==
The position and intensity of plasmon absorption and emission peaks are affected by molecular adsorption, which can be used in molecular sensors. For example, a fully operational device detecting casein in milk has been prototyped, based on detecting a change in absorption of a gold layer. Localized surface plasmons of metal nanoparticles can be used for sensing different types of molecules, proteins, etc.

Plasmons are being considered as a means of transmitting information on computer chips, since plasmons can support much higher frequencies (into the 100 THz range, whereas conventional wires become very lossy in the tens of GHz). However, for plasmon-based electronics to be practical, a plasmon-based amplifier analogous to the transistor, called a plasmonstor, needs to be created.

Plasmons have also been proposed as a means of high-resolution lithography and microscopy due to their extremely small wavelengths; both of these applications have seen successful demonstrations in the lab environment.

Finally, surface plasmons have the unique capacity to confine light to very small dimensions, which could enable many new applications.

Surface plasmons are very sensitive to the properties of the materials on which they propagate. This has led to their use to measure the thickness of monolayers on colloid films, such as screening and quantifying protein binding events. Companies such as Biacore have commercialized instruments that operate on these principles. Optical surface plasmons are being investigated with a view to improve makeup by L'Oréal and others.

In 2009, a Korean research team found a way to greatly improve organic light-emitting diode efficiency with the use of plasmons.

A group of European researchers led by IMEC began work to improve solar cell efficiencies and costs through incorporation of metallic nanostructures (using plasmonic effects) that can enhance absorption of light into different types of solar cells: crystalline silicon (c-Si), high-performance III-V, organic, and dye-sensitized. However, for plasmonic photovoltaic devices to function optimally, ultra-thin transparent conducting oxides are necessary. Full color holograms using plasmonics have been demonstrated.

== Plasmon-soliton ==
Plasmon-soliton mathematically refers to the hybrid solution of nonlinear amplitude equation e.g. for a metal-nonlinear media considering both the plasmon mode and solitary solution. A soliplasmon resonance is on the other hand considered as a quasiparticle combining the surface plasmon mode with spatial soliton as a result of a resonant interaction. To achieve one dimensional solitary propagation in a plasmonic waveguide while the surface plasmons should be localized at the interface, the lateral distribution of the field envelope should also be unchanged.

A graphene-based waveguide is a suitable platform for supporting hybrid plasmon-solitons due to the large effective area and huge nonlinearity. For example, the propagation of solitary waves in a graphene-dielectric heterostructure may appear as in the form of higher order solitons or discrete solitons resulting from the competition between diffraction and nonlinearity.

== See also ==
- Surface plasmon resonance
- Multi-parametric surface plasmon resonance
- Waves in plasmas
- Plasma oscillation
- Spinplasmonics
- Transformation optics
- Extraordinary optical transmission
- Phonon
- Graphene plasmonics
- Pines' demon
