= Plasmonic lens =

In nano-optics, a plasmonic lens generally refers to a lens for surface plasmon polaritons (SPPs), i.e. a device that redirects SPPs to converge towards a single focal point. Because SPPs can have very small wavelength, they can converge into a very small and very intense spot, much smaller than the free space wavelength and the diffraction limit.

A simple example of a plasmonic lens is a series of concentric rings on a metal film. Any light that hits the film from free space at a 90-degree angle, known as the normal, will get coupled into a SPP (this part works like a diffraction grating coupler), and that SPP will be heading towards the center of the circles, which is the focal point. Another example is a tapered "dimple".

In 2007, a novel, or technologically new, plasmonic lenses and waveguide by modulating light a mesoscale dielectric structure on a metallic film with arrayed nano-slits, which have constant depth but variant widths. The slits transport electromagnetic energy in the form of SPPs in nanometer sized waveguides and provide desired phase adjustments for manipulating the beam of light. The scientists claim that it is an improvement over other subwavelength imaging techniques, such as "superlenses", where the object and image are confined to the near field.

These devices have been suggested for various applications that take advantage of the small size and high intensity of the SPPs at the focal point. These include photolithography, heat-assisted magnetic recording, microscopy, biophotonics, biological molecule sensors, and solar cells, as well as other applications.

The term "plasmonic lens" is also sometimes used to describe something different: Any free-space lens (i.e., a lens that focuses free-space light, rather than SPPs), that has something to do with plasmonics.
