= History of metamaterials =

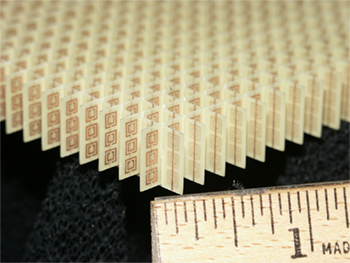
A metamaterial which produces a negative index of refraction. The total array consists of 3×20×20 unit cells with overall dimensions of 10×100×100 millimeters.

The history of metamaterials begins with artificial dielectrics in microwave engineering as it developed just after World War II. Yet, there are seminal explorations of artificial materials for manipulating electromagnetic waves at the end of the 19th century. Hence, the history of metamaterials is essentially a history of developing certain types of manufactured materials, which interact at radio frequency, microwave, and later optical frequencies.

As the science of materials has advanced, photonic materials have been developed which use the photon of light as the fundamental carrier of information. This has led to photonic crystals, and at the beginning of the new millennium, the proof of principle for functioning metamaterials with a negative index of refraction in the microwave- (at 10.5 Gigahertz) and optical range. This was followed by the first proof of principle for metamaterial cloaking (shielding an object from view), also in the microwave range, about six years later. However, a cloak that can conceal objects across the entire electromagnetic spectrum is still decades away. Many physics and engineering problems need to be solved.

Nevertheless, negative refractive materials have led to the development of metamaterial antennas and metamaterial microwave lenses for miniature wireless system antennas which are more efficient than their conventional counterparts. Also, metamaterial antennas are now commercially available. Meanwhile, subwavelength focusing with the superlens is also a part of present-day metamaterials research.

== Early wave studies ==
Electromagnetic waves are formed by the vibrations of electric fields and magnetic fields. These fields are perpendicular to one another in the direction the wave is traveling. Once formed, this energy travels at the speed of light until further interaction with matter. The electric field is in a vertical plane and the magnetic field in a horizontal plane. The two types of fields in electromagnetic waves are always in phase with each other.

Classical waves transfer energy without transporting matter through the medium (material). For example, waves in a pond do not carry the water molecules from place to place; rather the wave's energy travels through the water, leaving the water molecules in place. Additionally, charged particles, such as electrons and protons create electromagnetic fields when they move, and these fields transport the type of energy known as electromagnetic radiation, or light. A changing magnetic field will induce a changing electric field and vice versa—the two are linked. These changing fields form electromagnetic waves. Electromagnetic waves differ from mechanical waves in that they do not require a medium to propagate. This means that electromagnetic waves can travel not only through air and solid materials, but also through the vacuum of space.

The "history of metamaterials" can have a variety starting points depending on the properties of interest. Related early wave studies started in 1904 and progressed through more than half of the first part of the twentieth century. This early research included the relationship of the phase velocity to group velocity and the relationship of the wave vector and Poynting vector.

In 1904 the possibility of negative phase velocity accompanied by an anti-parallel group velocity were noted by Horace Lamb (book: Hydrodynamics) and Arthur Schuster (Book: Intro to Optics). However both thought practical achievement of these phenomena were not possible. In 1945 Leonid Mandelstam (also "Mandel'shtam") studied the anti-parallel phase and group advance in more detail. He is also noted for examining the electromagnetic characteristics of materials demonstrating negative refraction, as well as the first left-handed material concept. These studies included negative group velocity. He reported that such phenomena occurs in a crystal lattice. This may be considered significant because the metamaterial is a man made crystal lattice (structure). In 1905 H.C. Pocklington also studied certain effects related to negative group velocity.

V.E. Pafomov (1959), and several years later, the research team V.M. Agranovich and V.L. Ginzburg (1966) reported the repercussions of negative permittivity, negative permeability, and negative group velocity in their study of crystals and excitons.

In 1967, V.G. Veselago from Moscow Institute of Physics and Technology considered the theoretical model of medium that is now known as a metamaterial. However, physical experimentation did not occur until 33 years after the paper's publication due to lack of available materials and lack of sufficient computing power. It was not until the 1990s that materials and computing power became available to artificially produce the necessary structures. Veselago also predicted a number of electromagnetic phenomena that would be reversed including the refractive index. In addition, he is credited with coining the term "left handed material" for the present day metamaterial because of the anti-parallel behavior of the wave vector and other electromagnetic fields. Moreover, he noted that the material he was studying was a double negative material, as certain metamaterials are named today, because of the ability to simultaneously produce negative values for two important parameters, e.g. permittivity and permeability. In 1968, his paper was translated and published in English. He was nominated later for a Nobel prize.

Later still, developments in nanofabrication and subwavelength imaging techniques are now taking this work into optical wavelengths.

== Early electromagnetic media ==
Bose's apparatus demonstrated at the Royal Institution in 1897. A schematic diagram—the waveguide radiator is affixed on top of the transmitter at left. In addition, a pyramidal electromagnetic horn antenna is first used by Bose. This horn antenna acts as a "collecting funnel" for the electromagnetic radiation of interest.

In the 19th century Maxwell's equations united all previous observations, experiments, and established propositions pertaining to electricity and magnetism into a consistent theory, which is also fundamental to optics. Maxwell's work demonstrated that electricity, magnetism and even light are all manifestations of the same phenomenon, namely the electromagnetic field.

Likewise, the concept of using certain constructed materials as a method for manipulating electromagnetic waves dates back to the 19th century. Microwave theory had developed significantly during the latter part of the 19th century with the cylindrical parabolic reflector, dielectric lens, microwave absorbers, the cavity radiator, the radiating iris, and the pyramidal electromagnetic horn. The science involving microwaves also included round, square, and rectangular waveguides preceding Sir Rayleigh's published work on waveguide operation in 1896. Microwave optics, involving the focusing of microwaves, introduced quasi-optical components, and a treatment of microwave optics was published in 1897 (by Righi).

=== Jagadish Chandra Bose ===
Jagadish Chandra Bose was a scientist involved in original microwave research during the 1890s. As officiating professor of physics at Presidency College he involved himself with laboratory experiments and studies involving refraction, diffraction and polarization, as well as transmitters, receivers and various microwave components.

He connected receivers to a sensitive galvanometer, and developed crystals to be used as a receiver. The crystals operated in the shortwave radio range. Crystals were also developed to detect both white and ultraviolet light. These crystals were patented in 1904 for their capability to detect electromagnetic radiation. Furthermore, it appears that his work also anticipated the existence of p-type and n-type semiconductors by 60 years.

For the general public in 1895, Bose was able to remotely ring a bell and explode gunpowder with the use of electromagnetic waves. In 1896, it was reported that Bose had transmitted electromagnetic signals over almost a mile. In 1897, Bose reported on his microwave research (experiments) at the Royal Institution in London. There he demonstrated his apparatus at wavelengths that ranged from 2.5 centimeters to 5 millimeters.

== Early chiral media ==
In 1898, Jagadish Chandra Bose conducted the first microwave experiment on twisted structures. These twisted structures match the geometries that are known as artificial chiral media in today's terminology. By this time, he had also researched double refraction (birefringence) in crystals. Other research included polarization of electric field "waves" that crystals produce. He discovered this type of polarization in other materials including a class of dielectrics.

In addition, chirality as optical activity in a given material is a phenomenon that has been studied since the 19th century. By 1811, a study of quartz crystals revealed that such crystalline solids rotate the polarization of polarized light denoting optical activity. By 1815, materials other than crystals, such as oil of turpentine were known to exhibit chirality. However, the basic cause was not known. Louis Pasteur solved the problem (chirality of the molecules) originating a new discipline known as stereochemistry. At the macroscopic scale, Lindman applied microwaves to the problem with wire spirals (wire helices) in 1920 and 1922.

Karl F. Lindman, from 1914 and into the 1920s, studied artificial chiral media formed by a collection of randomly oriented small spirals. He was written about by present-day metamaterials scientists: Ismo V. Lindell, Ari H. Sihvola, and Juhani Kurkijarvi.

== 20th century artificial dielectrics ==
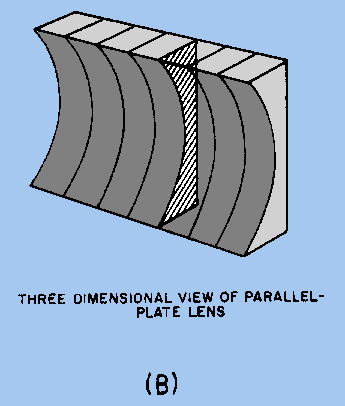
This "lens" converts the input spherical microwave radiation into parallel (collimated) lines in a given direction at the exit side of the microwave lens. The focusing action of the lens is accomplished by the refracting qualities of the metallic strip.

Much of the historic research related to metamaterials is weighted from the view of antenna beam shaping within microwave engineering just after World War II. Furthermore, metamaterials appear to be historically linked to the body of research pertaining to artificial dielectrics throughout the late 1940s, the 1950s and the 1960s. The most common use for artificial dielectrics throughout prior decades has been in the microwave regime for antenna beam shaping. The artificial dielectrics had been proposed as a low cost and lightweight "tool". Research on artificial dielectrics, other than metamaterials, is still ongoing for pertinent parts of the electromagnetic spectrum.

Pioneering works in microwave engineering on artificial dielectrics in microwave were produced by Winston E. Kock, Seymour Cohn, John Brown, and Walter Rotman. Periodic artificial structures were proposed by Kock, Rotman, and Sergei Schelkunoff. There is also an extensive reference list that is focused on the properties of artificial dielectrics in the 1991 book Field Theory of Guided Waves by Robert E. Collin.

Schelkunoff achieved notice for contributions to antenna theory and electromagnetic wave propagation. "Magnetic particles made of capacitively loaded loops were also suggested by Sergei Schelkunoff in 1952 (who was a senior colleague of Winston Kock at Bell Labs at the time). However, Schelkunoff suggested these particles as a means of synthesizing high permeability (and not negative) values but he recognized that such high permeability artificial dielectrics would be quite dispersive."

W.E. Kock proposed metallic and wire lenses for antennas. Some of these are the metallic delay lens, parallel-wire lens, and the wire mesh lens. In addition, he conducted analytical studies regarding the response of customized metallic particles to a quasistatic electromagnetic radiation. As with the current large group of researchers conveying the behavior of metamaterials, Kock noted behaviors and structure in artificial materials that are similar to metamaterials.

He employed particles, which would be of varying geometric shape; spheres, discs, ellipsoids and prolate or oblate spheroids, and would be either isolated or set in a repeating pattern as part of an array configuration. Furthermore, he was able to determine that such particles behave as a dielectric medium. He also noticed that the permittivity "ε" and permeability "μ" of these particles can be purposely tuned, but not independently.

With metamaterials, however, local values for both ε and μ are designed as part of the fabrication process, or analytically designed in theoretical studies. Because of this process, individual metamaterial inclusions can be independently tuned.

With artificial dielectrics Kock was able to see that any value for permittivity and permeability, arbitrarily large or small, can be achieved, and that this included the possibility of negative values for these parameters. The optical properties of the medium depended solely on the particles' geometrical shape and spacing, rather than on their own intrinsic behavior. His work also anticipated the split-ring resonator, a fabricated periodic structure that is a common workhorse for metamaterials.

Kock, however, did not investigate the simultaneous occurrence of negative values of ε and μ, which has become one of the first achievements defining modern metamaterials. This was because research in artificial materials was oriented toward other goals, such as creating plasma media at RF or microwave frequencies related to the overarching needs of NASA and the space program at that time.

Walter Rotman and R.F. Turner advanced microwave beam shaping systems with a lens that has three perfect focal points; two symmetrically located off-axis and one on-axis. They published the design equations for the improved straight-front-face lens, the evaluation of its phase control capabilities, scanning capabilities, and the demonstrated fabrication techniques applicable to this type of design. Rotman invented other periodic structures that include many types of surface wave antennas: the trough waveguide, the channel waveguide, and the sandwich wire antenna.

== Photonic structures ==
"At frequencies of a few hundred gigahertz and lower, electrons are the principle particles which serve as the workhorse of devices. On the other hand, at infrared through optical to ultraviolet wavelengths, the photon is the fundamental particle of choice." The word 'photonics' appeared in the late 1960s to describe a research field whose goal was to use light to perform functions that traditionally fell within the typical domain of electronics, such as telecommunications, information processing, among other processes. The term photonics more specifically connotes:

- The particle properties of light,
- The potential of creating signal processing device technologies using photons,
- The practical application of optics, and
- An analogy to electronics.

Hence, as photonic materials are used, the photons, rather than electrons, become the fundamental carriers of information. Furthermore, the photon appears to be a more efficient carrier of information, and materials that can process photonic signals are both in use and in further development. Additionally, developing photonic materials will lead to further miniaturization of components.

In 1987 Eli Yablonovitch proposed controlling spontaneous emissions and constructing physical zones in periodic dielectrics that forbid certain wavelengths of electromagnetic radiation. These capabilities would be built into three-dimensional periodic dielectric structures (artificial dielectric). He noted that controlling spontaneous emission is desirable for semiconductor processes.

== Exceptional phenomena ==
=== Invention of the metamaterial ===
Historically, and conventionally, the function or behavior of materials can be altered through their chemistry. This has long been known. For example, adding lead changes the color or hardness of glass. However, at the end of the 20th century this description was expanded by John Pendry, a physicist from Imperial College in London. In the 1990s he was consulting for a British company, Marconi Materials Technology, as a condensed matter physics expert. The company manufactured a stealth technology made of a radiation-absorbing carbon that was for naval vessels. However, the company did not understand the physics of the material. The company asked Pendry if he could understand how the material worked.

Pendry discovered that the radiation absorption property did not come from the molecular or chemical structure of the material, i.e. the carbon per se. This property came from the long and thin, physical shape of the carbon fibers. He realized rather than conventionally altering a material through its chemistry, as lead does with glass, the behavior of a material can be altered by changing a material's internal structure on a very fine scale. The very fine scale was less than the wavelength of the electromagnetic radiation that is applied. The theory applies across the electromagnetic spectrum that is in use by today's technologies. The radiations of interest are from radio waves, and microwaves, through infrared to the visible wavelengths. Scientists view this material as "beyond" conventional materials. Hence, the Greek word "meta" was attached, and these are called metamaterials.

After successfully deducing and realizing the carbon fiber structure, Pendry further proposed that he try to change the magnetic properties of a non-magnetic material, also by altering its physical structure. The material would not be intrinsically magnetic, nor inherently susceptible to being magnetized. Copper wire is such a non-magnetic material. He envisioned fabricating a non-magnetic composite material, which could mimic the movements of electrons orbiting atoms. However, the structures are fabricated on a scale that is magnitudes larger than the atom, yet smaller than the radiated wavelength.

He envisioned and hypothesized miniature loops of copper wire set in a fiberglass substrate could mimic the action of electrons but on a larger scale. Furthermore, this composite material could act like a slab of iron. In addition, he deduced that a current run through the loops of wire results in a magnetic response.

This metamaterial idea resulted in variations. Cutting the loops results in a magnetic resonator, which acts like a switch. The switch, in turn, would allow Pendry to determine or alter the magnetic properties of the material simply by choice. At the time, Pendry didn't realize the significance of the two materials he had engineered. By combining the electrical properties of Marconi's radar-absorbing material with his new man-made magnetic material he had unwittingly placed in his hands a new way to manipulate electromagnetic radiation. In 1999, Pendry published his new conception of artificially produced magnetic materials in a notable physics journal. This was read by scientists all over the world, and it "stoked their imagination".

=== Negative refractive index ===
In 1967, Victor Veselago produced an often cited, seminal work on a theoretical material that could produce extraordinary effects that are difficult or impossible to produce in nature. At that time he proposed that a reversal of Snell's law, an extraordinary lens, and other exceptional phenomena can occur within the laws of physics. This theory lay dormant for a few decades. There were no materials available in nature, or otherwise, that could physically realize Veselago's analysis. Not until thirty-three years later did the properties of this material, a metamaterial, became a subdiscipline of physics and engineering.

However, there were certain observations, demonstrations, and implementations that closely preceded this work. Permittivity of metals, with values that could be stretched from the positive to the negative domain, had been studied extensively. In other words, negative permittivity was a known phenomenon by the time the first metamaterial was produced. Contemporaries of Kock were involved in this type of research. The concentrated effort was led by the US government for researching interactions between the ionosphere and the re-entry of NASA space vehicles.

In the 1990s, Pendry et al. developed sequentially repeating thin wire structures, analogous to crystal structures. These extended the range of material permittivity. However, a more revolutionary structure developed by Pendry et al. was a structure that could control magnetic interactions (permeability) of the radiated light, albeit only at microwave frequencies. This sequentially repeating, split ring structure, extended material magnetic parameters into the negative. This lattice or periodic, "magnetic" structure was constructed from non-magnetic components.

Hence, in electromagnetic domain, a negative value for permittivity and permeability occurring simultaneously was a requirement to produce the first metamaterials. These were beginning steps for proof of principle regarding Veselago's original 1967 proposal.

In 2000, a team of UCSD researchers produced and demonstrated metamaterials, which exhibited unusual physical properties that were never before produced in nature. These materials obey the laws of physics, but behave differently from normal materials. In essence these negative index metamaterials were noted for having the ability to reverse many of the physical properties that govern the behavior of ordinary optical materials. One of those unusual properties is the capability to reverse, for the first time, the Snell's law of refraction. Until this May 2000 demonstration by the UCSD team, the material was unavailable. Advances during the 1990s in fabrication and computation capabilities allowed these first metamaterials to be constructed. Thus, testing the "new" metamaterial began for the effects described by Victor Veselago 30 years earlier, but only at first in the microwave frequency domain. Reversal of group velocity was explicitly announced in the related published paper. First demonstration of a negative index of refraction in the optical range was done by Vladimir M. Shalaev et al.

=== The super lens ===
The super lens or superlens is a practical structure based on John Pendry's work describing a perfect lens that can go beyond the diffraction limit by focusing all four fourier components. Pendry's paper described a theoretical novel lens that could capture images below the diffraction limit by employing the negative refractive index behavior. The super lens is a practical realization of this theory. It is a working lens that can capture images below the diffraction limit even though limitations occur due to the inefficiencies of conventional materials. This means that although there are losses, enough of an image is returned to show this work was a successful demonstration.

=== Invisibility cloak ===
Ulf Leonhardt was born in East Germany, and presently occupies the theoretical physics chair at the University of St. Andrews in Scotland, and is considered one the leaders in the science of creating an invisibility cloak. Around 1999, Leonhardt began work on how to build a cloaking device with a few other colleagues. Leonhardt stated that at the time invisibility was not considered fashionable. He then wrote a theoretical study entitled "Optical Conformal Mapping". The first sentence sums up the objective: "An invisibility device should guide light around an object as if nothing were there."

In 2005, he sent the paper to three notable scientific journals, Nature, Nature Physics, and Science. Each journal, in turn, rejected the paper. In 2006, Physical Review Letters rejected the paper for publication, as well. However, according to the PRL assessment, one of the anonymous reviewers noted that (he or she ) had been to two meetings in the previous months with John Pendry's group, who were also working on a cloaking device. From the meetings, the reviewer also became aware of a patent that Pendry and his colleagues were supposed to file. Leonhardt was at the time unaware of the Pendry group's work. Because of the Pendry meetings, Leonhardt's work was not really considered new physics by the reviewer and, therefore, did not merit publication in Physical Review Letters.

Later in 2006, Science (the journal) reversed its decision and contacted Leonhardt to publish his paper because it had just received a theoretical study from Pendry's team entitled "Controlling Electromagnetic Fields". Science considered both papers strikingly similar and published them both in the same issue of Science Express on May 25, 2006. The published papers touched off research efforts by a dozen groups to build cloaking devices at locations around the globe, which would test out the mathematics of both papers.

Only months after the submission of notable invisibility cloak theories, a practical device was built and demonstrated by David Schurig and David Smith, engineering researchers of Duke University (October 2006). It was limited to the microwave range so the object was not invisible to the human eye. However, it demonstrated proof of principle.

== Transformation optics ==
The original theoretical papers on cloaking opened a new science discipline called transformation optics.

== See also ==
- Mechanical Metamaterials
- Metamaterial cloaking – Shielding an object from view using materials made to redirect light
- Acoustic metamaterials – Material designed to manipulate sound waves
- Quantum metamaterials – Type of material
- Photonic metamaterials – Type of electromagnetic metamaterial
- Nonlinear metamaterials
- Seismic metamaterials
- Metamaterial absorber
- Plasmonic metamaterials – Metamaterial that uses surface plasmons to achieve optical properties not seen in nature
- Terahertz metamaterials
- Tunable metamaterials
- Split-ring resonator – Structure in some metamaterials
- Theories of cloaking

== Further reading and general references ==
- Rotman, W.; Turner, R. (1963). "Wide-angle microwave lens for line source applications" (PDF). IEEE Transactions on Antennas and Propagation. 11 (6): 623. Bibcode:1963ITAP...11..623R. doi:10.1109/TAP.1963.1138114. Archived from the original (PDF) on October 8, 2012.
- Shamonina, E.; Solymar, L. (February 8, 2007). "Metamaterials: How the subject started" (PDF). Metamaterials. 01 (1): 12–18. Bibcode:2007MetaM...1...12S. doi:10.1016/j.metmat.2007.02.001. Archived from the original (PDF) on July 23, 2010.
- Sihvola, Ari (February 12, 2007). "Metamaterials in electromagnetics" (PDF). Metamaterials. 01 (1): 2–11. Bibcode:2007MetaM...1....2S. doi:10.1016/j.metmat.2007.02.003.
- Ziolkowski, Richard W. (September 2006). "Metamaterial-Based Antennas: Research and Developments" (PDF). IEICE Transactions on Electronics. E89-C (9): 1267–1275. doi:10.1093/ietele/e89-c.9.1267.
- Boltasseva, Alexandra; Vladimir M. Shalaev (March 18, 2008). "Fabrication of optical negative-index metamaterials" (PDF). Metamaterials. 2 (1): 1–17. Bibcode:2008MetaM...2....1B. doi:10.1016/j.metmat.2008.03.004.
- Zahn, Markus (instructor). "An artificial dielectric". Course title: MIT 6.013 Electromagnetics and Applications, Fall 20. from Massachusetts Institute of Technology.
- Wade, Paul. "Metal Plate Lens Antennas" (PDF). Chapter 3. Description of building a mobile metal plate antenna.
- Invited paper: Engheta, N. (2003). "Metamaterials with negative permittivity and permeability: background, salient features, and new trends" (PDF). Microwave Symposium Digest, 2003 IEEE MTT-S International. Vol. 1. Vol. 1. p. 187. doi:10.1109/MWSYM.2003.1210912. ISBN 0-7803-7695-1. Archived from the original (PDF) on August 21, 2011.
- Johri, Manoj; Harihar Paudyal (May 2010). "Left Handed Materials: a new Pardigm in Structured Electromagnetics" (PDF). Trieste, Italy.: produced by ICTP, UNESCO, and the IAEA. pp. 1–12. IC/2010/015. Archived from the original (PDF) on 2011-04-01. – Technical review of metamterials research.
- Kaku, Michio (April 2008). "Invisibility …". Natural History Magazine.
- Slyusar V.I. Metamaterials on antenna solutions.// 7th International Conference on Antenna Theory and Techniques ICATT'09, Lviv, Ukraine, October 6–9, 2009. - pp. 19 – 24
