= Photonic metamaterial =

Type of electromagnetic metamaterial

A photonic metamaterial (PM), also known as an optical metamaterial, is a type of electromagnetic metamaterial, that interacts with light, covering terahertz (THz), infrared (IR) or visible wavelengths. The materials employ a periodic, cellular structure.

The subwavelength periodicity distinguishes photonic metamaterials from photonic band gap or photonic crystal structures. The cells are on a scale that is magnitudes larger than the atom, yet much smaller than the radiated wavelength, are on the order of nanometers.

In a conventional material, the response to electric and magnetic fields, and hence to light, is determined by atoms. In metamaterials, cells take the role of atoms in a material that is homogeneous at scales larger than the cells, yielding an effective medium model.

Some photonic metamaterials exhibit magnetism at high frequencies, resulting in strong magnetic coupling. This can produce a negative index of refraction in the optical range.

Potential applications include cloaking and transformation optics.

Photonic crystals differ from PM in that the size and periodicity of their scattering elements are larger, on the order of the wavelength. Also, a photonic crystal is not homogeneous, so it is not possible to define values of ε (permittivity) or u (permeability).

== History ==
While researching whether or not matter interacts with the magnetic component of light, Victor Veselago (1967) envisioned the possibility of refraction with a negative sign, according to Maxwell's equations. A refractive index with a negative sign is the result of permittivity, ε < 0 (less than zero) and magnetic permeability, μ < 0 (less than zero). Veselago's analysis has been cited in over 1500 peer-reviewed articles and many books.

A comparison of refraction in a left-handed metamaterial to that in a normal material

In the mid-1990s, metamaterials were first seen as potential technologies for applications such as nanometer-scale imaging and cloaking objects. For example, in 1995, Guerra fabricated a transparent grating with 50 nm lines and spaces, and then coupled this (what would be later called) photonic metamaterial with an immersion objective to resolve a silicon grating having 50 nm lines and spaces, far beyond the diffraction limit for the 650 nm wavelength illumination in air. And in 2002, Guerra et al. published their demonstrated use of subwavelength nano-optics (photonic metamaterials) for optical data storage at densities well above the diffraction limit. As of 2015, metamaterial antennas were commercially available.

First demonstration of a negative index of refraction in the optical range was done by Vladimir M. Shalaev et al, using pair of metal nanorods (sometimes conversationally referred to as Shalaev's chopsticks).

Negative permeability was achieved with a split-ring resonator (SRR) as part of the subwavelength cell. The SRR achieved negative permeability within a narrow frequency range. This was combined with a symmetrically positioned electric conducting post, which created the first negative index metamaterial, operating in the microwave band. Experiments and simulations demonstrated the presence of a left-handed propagation band, a left-handed material. The experimental confirmation of negative index of refraction using SRRs occurred soon after, also at microwave frequencies. Magnetic permeablity across the entire visible part of the spectrum using pairs of strips was shown in 2007.

== Negative permeability and negative permittivity ==
Photograph of the metamaterial lattice used to demonstrate negative refraction. The array of square split-ring resonators gives the material a negative magnetic permeability, whereas the array of straight wires gives it a negative permittivity.

Natural materials, such as precious metals, can achieve ε < 0 up to the visible frequencies. However, at terahertz, infrared and visible frequencies, natural materials have a very weak magnetic coupling component, or permeability. In other words, susceptibility to the magnetic component of radiated light can be considered negligible.

Negative index metamaterials behave contrary to the conventional "right-handed" interaction of light found in conventional optical materials. Hence, these are dubbed left-handed materials or negative index materials (NIMs), among other nomenclatures.

Only fabricated NIMs exhibit this capability. Photonic crystals, like many other known systems, can exhibit unusual propagation behavior such as reversal of phase and group velocities. However, negative refraction does not occur in these systems.

Naturally occurring ferromagnetic and antiferromagnetic materials can achieve magnetic resonance, but with significant losses. In natural materials such as natural magnets and ferrites, resonance for the electric (coupling) response and magnetic (coupling) response do not occur at the same frequency.

== Optical frequency ==
Photonic metamaterial SRRs have reached scales below 100 nanometers, using electron beam and nanolithography. One nanoscale SRR cell has three small metallic rods that are physically connected. This is configured as a U shape and functions as a nano-inductor. The gap between the tips of the U-shape function as a nano-capacitor. Hence, it is an optical nano-LC resonator. These "inclusions" create local electric and magnetic fields when externally excited. These inclusions are usually ten times smaller than the vacuum wavelength of the light c0 at the resonant frequency. The inclusions can then be evaluated by using an effective medium approximation.

PMs display a magnetic response with useful magnitude at optical frequencies. This includes negative permeability, despite the absence of magnetic materials. Analogous to ordinary optical material, PMs can be treated as an effective medium that is characterized by effective medium parameters ε(ω) and μ(ω), or similarly, ε_{eff} and μ_{eff}.

The negative refractive index of PMs in the optical frequency range was experimentally demonstrated in 2005 by Shalaev et al. (at the telecom wavelength λ = 1.5 μm) and by Brueck et al. (at λ = 2 μm) at nearly the same time.

All-dielectric subwavelength metasurface focusing lens operating in the near infrared has been demonstrated by the Shalaev group in collaboration with the Raytheon team. This lens is currently used in Raytheon defense system products.

== Effective medium model ==
An effective (transmission) medium approximation describes material slabs that, when reacting to an external excitation, are "effectively" homogeneous, with corresponding "effective" parameters that include "effective" ε and μ and apply to the slab as a whole. Individual inclusions or cells may have values different from the slab. However, there are cases where the effective medium approximation does not hold and one needs to be aware of its applicability.

== Coupling magnetism ==
Negative magnetic permeability was originally achieved in a left-handed medium at microwave frequencies by using arrays of split-ring resonators. In most natural materials, the magnetically coupled response starts to taper off at frequencies in the gigahertz range, which implies that significant magnetism does not occur at optical frequencies. The effective permeability of such materials is unity, μ_{eff} = 1. Hence, the magnetic component of a radiated electromagnetic field has virtually no effect on natural occurring materials at optical frequencies.

In metamaterials the cell acts as a meta-atom, a larger scale magnetic dipole, analogous to the picometer-sized atom. For meta-atoms constructed from gold, μ < 0 can be achieved at telecommunication frequencies but not at visible frequencies. The visible frequency has been elusive because the plasma frequency of metals is the ultimate limiting condition.

== Design and fabrication ==
Optical wavelengths are much shorter than microwaves, making subwavelength optical metamaterials more difficult to realize. Microwave metamaterials can be fabricated from circuit board materials, while lithography techniques must be employed to produce PMs.

Successful experiments used a periodic arrangement of short wires or metallic pieces with varied shapes. In a different study the whole slab was electrically connected.

Fabrication techniques include electron beam lithography, nanostructuring with a focused ion beam and interference lithography.

In 2014 a polarization-insensitive metamaterial prototype was demonstrated to absorb energy over a broad band (a super-octave) of infrared wavelengths. The material displayed greater than 98% measured average absorptivity that it maintained over a wide ±45° field-of-view for mid-infrared wavelengths between 1.77 and 4.81 μm. One use is to conceal objects from infrared sensors. Palladium provided greater bandwidth than silver or gold. A genetic algorithm randomly modified an initial candidate pattern, testing and eliminating all but the best. The process was repeated over multiple generations until the design became effective.

The metamaterial is made of four layers on a silicon substrate. The first layer is palladium, covered by polyimide (plastic) and a palladium screen on top. The screen has sub-wavelength cutouts that block the various wavelengths. A polyimide layer caps the whole absorber. It can absorb 90 percent of infrared radiation at up to a 55 degree angle to the screen. The layers do not need accurate alignment. The polyimide cap protects the screen and helps reduce any impedance mismatch that might occur when the wave crosses from the air into the device.

== Research ==
=== One-way transmission ===
In 2015 visible light joined microwave and infrared NIMs in propagating light in only one direction. ("mirrors" instead reduce light transmission in the reverse direction, requiring low light levels behind the mirror to work.)

The material combined two optical nanostructures: a multi-layered block of alternating silver and glass sheets and metal grates. The silver-glass structure is a "hyperbolic" metamaterial, which treats light differently depending on which direction the waves are traveling. Each layer is tens of nanometers thick—much thinner than visible light's 400 to 700 nm wavelengths, making the block opaque to visible light, although light entering at certain angles can propagate inside the material.

Adding chromium grates with sub-wavelength spacings bent incoming red or green light waves enough that they could enter and propagate inside the block. On the opposite side of the block, another set of grates allowed light to exit, angled away from its original direction. The spacing of the exit grates was different from that of the entrance grates, bending incident light so that external light could not enter the block from that side. Around 30 times more light passed through in the forward direction than in reverse. The intervening blocks reduced the need for precise alignment of the two grates with respect to each other.

Such structures hold potential for applications in optical communication—for instance, they could be integrated into photonic computer chips that split or combine signals carried by light waves. Other potential applications include biosensing using nanoscale particles to deflect light to angles steep enough to travel through the hyperbolic material and out the other side.

=== Lumped circuit elements ===
By employing a combination of plasmonic and non-plasmonic nanoparticles, lumped circuit element nanocircuits at infrared and optical frequencies appear to be possible. Conventional lumped circuit elements are not available in a conventional way.

Subwavelength lumped circuit elements proved workable in the microwave and radio frequency (RF) domain. The lumped element concept allowed for element simplification and circuit modularization. Nanoscale fabrication techniques exist to accomplish subwavelength geometries.

=== Cell design ===
Metals such as gold, silver, aluminum and copper conduct currents at RF and microwave frequencies. At optical frequencies characteristics of some noble metals are altered. Rather than normal current flow, plasmonic resonances occur as the real part of the complex permittivity becomes negative. Therefore, the main current flow is actually the electric displacement current density ∂D / ∂t, and can be termed as the "flowing optical current".

At subwavelength scales the cell's impedance becomes dependent on shape, size, material and the optical frequency illumination. The particle's orientation with the optical electric field may also help determine the impedance. Conventional silicon dielectrics have the real permittivity component ε_{real} > 0 at optical frequencies, causing the nanoparticle to act as a capacitive impedance, a nanocapacitor. Conversely, if the material is a noble metal such as gold or silver, with ε_{real} < 0, then it takes on inductive characteristics, becoming a nanoinductor. Material loss is represented as a nano-resistor.

=== Tunability ===
The most commonly applied scheme to achieve a tunable index of refraction is electro-optical tuning. Here the change in refractive index is proportional to either the applied electric field, or is proportional to the square modulus of the electric field. These are the Pockels effect and Kerr effects, respectively.

An alternative is to employ a nonlinear optical material and depend on the optical field intensity to modify the refractive index or magnetic parameters.

=== Layering ===
Stacking layers produces NIMs at optical frequencies. However, the surface configuration (non-planar, bulk) of the SRR normally prevents stacking. Although a single-layer SRR structure can be constructed on a dielectric surface, it is relatively difficult to stack these bulk structures due to alignment tolerance requirements. A stacking technique for SRRs was published in 2007 that uses dielectric spacers to apply a planarization procedure to flatten the SRR layer. It appears that arbitrary many layers can be made this way, including any chosen number of unit cells and variant spatial arrangements of individual layers.

=== Frequency doubling ===
In 2014 researchers announced a 400 nanometer thick frequency-doubling non-linear mirror that can be tuned to work at near-infrared to mid-infrared to terahertz frequencies. The material operates with much lower intensity light than traditional approaches. For a given input light intensity and structure thickness, the metamaterial produced approximately one million times higher intensity output. The mirrors do not require matching the phase velocities of the input and output waves.

It can produce giant nonlinear response for multiple nonlinear optical processes, such as second harmonic, sum- and difference-frequency generation, as well a variety of four-wave mixing processes. The demonstration device converted light with a wavelength of 8000 to 4000 nanometers.

The device is made of a stack of thin layers of indium, gallium and arsenic or aluminum, indium and arsenic. 100 of these layers, each between one and twelve nanometers thick, were faced on top by a pattern of asymmetrical, crossed gold nanostructures that form coupled quantum wells and a layer of gold on the bottom.

Potential applications include remote sensing and medical applications that call for compact laser systems.

=== Other ===
Dyakonov surface waves (DSW) relate to birefringence related to photonic crystals, metamaterial anisotropy. Other photonic metamaterials in the near infrared and in the visible are described in works.

== See also ==
- Terahertz gap
- Negative index metamaterials
- History of metamaterials
- Metamaterial cloaking
- Metamaterial
- Metamaterial antennas
- Nonlinear metamaterials
- Photonic crystal
- Seismic metamaterials
- Split-ring resonator
- Acoustic metamaterials
- Metamaterial absorber
- Plasmonic metamaterials
- Terahertz metamaterials
- Tunable metamaterials
- Mechanical metamaterial
- Transformation optics
- Theories of cloaking
- Metamaterials (journal)
- Metamaterials Handbook
- Metamaterials: Physics and Engineering Explorations

== General references ==
- Litchinitser, N.M.; V.M. Shalaev (2008-02-03). "Photonic metamaterials" (PDF). Laser Phys. Lett. 5 (6): 411–420 (2008). Bibcode:2008LaPhL...5..411L. doi:10.1002/lapl.200810015. S2CID 7547242.
- Shalaev, Vladimir M., et al. Negative Index of Refraction in Optical Metamaterials arXiv.org. 17 pages.
- Shalaev, Vladimir M., et al. Negative index of refraction in optical metamaterials Opt. Lett. Vol. 30. 2005-12-30. 3 pages
