= Electromagnetic metamaterial =

Electromagnetic metamaterials are metamaterials affecting electromagnetic waves that impinge on or interact with its structural features, which are smaller than the radiation wavelength. To behave as a homogeneous material accurately described by an effective refractive index, its features must be much smaller than the wavelength.

The unusual properties of metamaterials arise from the resonant response of each constituent element rather than their spatial arrangement into a lattice. It allows considering the local effective material parameters (permittivity and permeability). The resonance effect related to the mutual arrangement of elements is responsible for Bragg scattering, which underlies the physics of photonic crystals, another class of electromagnetic materials. Unlike the local resonances, Bragg scattering and corresponding Bragg stop-band have a low-frequency limit determined by the lattice spacing. The subwavelength approximation ensures that the Bragg stop-bands with the strong spatial dispersion effects are at higher frequencies and can be neglected. The criterion for shifting the local resonance below the lower Bragg stop-band make it possible to build a photonic phase transition diagram in a parameter space, for example, size and permittivity of the constituent element. Such diagram displays the domain of structure parameters allowing the metamaterial properties observation in the electromagnetic material.

For microwave radiation, the features are on the order of millimeters. Microwave frequency metamaterials are usually constructed as arrays of electrically conductive elements (such as loops of wire) that have suitable inductive and capacitive characteristics. Many microwave metamaterials use split-ring resonators.

Photonic metamaterials are structured on the nanometer scale and manipulate light at optical frequencies. Photonic crystals and frequency-selective surfaces such as diffraction gratings, dielectric mirrors and optical coatings exhibit similarities to subwavelength structured metamaterials. However, these are usually considered distinct from metamaterials, as their function arises from diffraction or interference and thus cannot be approximated as a homogeneous material. However, material structures such as photonic crystals are effective in the visible light spectrum. The middle of the visible spectrum has a wavelength of approximately 560 nm (for sunlight). Photonic crystal structures are generally half this size or smaller, that is < 280 nm.

Plasmonic metamaterials utilize surface plasmons, which are packets of electrical charge that collectively oscillate at the surfaces of metals at optical frequencies.

Frequency selective surfaces (FSS) can exhibit subwavelength characteristics and are known variously as artificial magnetic conductors (AMC) or High Impedance Surfaces (HIS). FSS display inductive and capacitive characteristics that are directly related to their subwavelength structure.

Electromagnetic metamaterials can be divided into different classes, as follows:

== Negative refractive index ==
A comparison of refraction in a left-handed metamaterial to that in a normal material

Negative-index metamaterials (NIM) are characterized by a negative index of refraction. Other terms for NIMs include "left-handed media", "media with a negative refractive index", and "backward-wave media". NIMs where the negative index of refraction arises from simultaneously negative permittivity and negative permeability are also known as double negative metamaterials or double negative materials (DNG).

Assuming a material well-approximated by a real permittivity and permeability, the relationship between permittivity $\varepsilon_r$, permeability $\mu_r$ and refractive index n is given by $n =\pm\sqrt{\varepsilon_\mathrm{r}\mu_\mathrm{r}}$. All known non-metamaterial transparent materials (glass, water, ...) possess positive $\varepsilon_r$ and $\mu_r$. By convention the positive square root is used for n. However, some engineered metamaterials have $\varepsilon_r$ and $\mu_r < 0$. Because the product $\varepsilon_r\mu_r$ is positive, n is real. Under such circumstances, it is necessary to take the negative square root for n. When both $\varepsilon_r$ and $\mu_r$ are positive (negative), waves travel in the forward (backward) direction. Electromagnetic waves cannot propagate in materials with $\varepsilon_r$ and $\mu_r$ of opposite sign as the refractive index becomes imaginary. Such materials are opaque for electromagnetic radiation and examples include plasmonic materials such as metals (gold, silver, ...).

Video representing negative refraction of light at uniform planar interface.

The foregoing considerations are simplistic for actual materials, which must have complex-valued $\varepsilon_r$ and $\mu_r$. The real parts of both $\varepsilon_r$ and $\mu_r$ do not have to be negative for a passive material to display negative refraction. Indeed, a negative refractive index for circularly polarized waves can also arise from chirality. Metamaterials with negative n have numerous interesting properties:

- Snell's law (n_{1}sinθ_{1} = n_{2}sinθ_{2}) still describes refraction, but as n_{2} is negative, incident and refracted rays are on the same side of the surface normal at an interface of positive and negative index materials.
- Cherenkov radiation points the other way.
- The time-averaged Poynting vector is antiparallel to phase velocity. However, for waves (energy) to propagate, a –μ must be paired with a –ε in order to satisfy the wave number dependence on the material parameters $k c = \omega\sqrt{\mu \varepsilon}$.

Negative index of refraction derives mathematically from the vector triplet E, H and k.

For plane waves propagating in electromagnetic metamaterials, the electric field, magnetic field and wave vector follow a left-hand rule, the reverse of the behavior of conventional optical materials.

To date, only metamaterials exhibit a negative index of refraction.

== Single negative ==
Single negative (SNG) metamaterials have either negative relative permittivity (εr) or negative relative permeability (μr), but not both. They act as metamaterials when combined with a different, complementary SNG, jointly acting as a DNG.

Epsilon negative media (ENG) display a negative εr while μr is positive. Many plasmas exhibit this characteristic. For example, noble metals such as gold or silver are ENG in the infrared and visible spectrums.

Mu-negative media (MNG) display a positive εr and negative μr. Gyrotropic or gyromagnetic materials exhibit this characteristic. A gyrotropic material is one that has been altered by the presence of a quasistatic magnetic field, enabling a magneto-optic effect. a phenomenon in which an electromagnetic wave propagates through such a medium. In such a material, left- and right-rotating elliptical polarizations can propagate at different speeds. When light is transmitted through a layer of magneto-optic material, the result is called the Faraday effect: the polarization plane can be rotated, forming a Faraday rotator. The results of such a reflection are known as the magneto-optic Kerr effect (not to be confused with the nonlinear Kerr effect). Two gyrotropic materials with reversed rotation directions of the two principal polarizations are called optical isomers.

Joining a slab of ENG material and slab of MNG material resulted in properties such as resonances, anomalous tunneling, transparency and zero reflection. Like negative-index materials, SNGs are innately dispersive, so their εr, μr and refraction index n, are a function of frequency. MNG across the entire visible part of the spectrum was shown in a study by Cai.

== Hyperbolic ==
Hyperbolic metamaterials (HMMs) behave as a metal for certain polarization or direction of light propagation and behave as a dielectric for the other due to the negative and positive permittivity tensor components, giving extreme anisotropy. The material's dispersion relation in wavevector space forms a hyperboloid and therefore it is called a hyperbolic metamaterial. The extreme anisotropy of HMMs leads to directional propagation of light within and on the surface. HMMs have shown various potential applications, such as sensing, reflection modulator, all-optical ultra-fast switching for integrated photonics, imaging, super high resolution and single photon source, steering of optical signals, enhanced plasmon resonance effects.

== Bandgap ==
Electromagnetic bandgap metamaterials (EBG or EBM) control light propagation. This is accomplished either with photonic crystals (PC) or left-handed materials (LHM). PCs can prohibit light propagation altogether. Both classes can allow light to propagate in specific, designed directions and both can be designed with bandgaps at desired frequencies. The period size of EBGs is an appreciable fraction of the wavelength, creating constructive and destructive interference.

PC are distinguished from sub-wavelength structures, such as tunable metamaterials, because the PC derives its properties from its bandgap characteristics. PCs are sized to match the wavelength of light, versus other metamaterials that expose sub-wavelength structure. Furthermore, PCs function by diffracting light. In contrast, metamaterial does not use diffraction.

PCs have periodic inclusions that inhibit wave propagation due to the inclusions' destructive interference from scattering. The photonic bandgap property of PCs makes them the electromagnetic analog of electronic semi-conductor crystals.

EBGs have the goal of creating high quality, low loss, periodic, dielectric structures. An EBG affects photons in the same way semiconductor materials affect electrons. PCs are the perfect bandgap material, because they allow no light propagation. Each unit of the prescribed periodic structure acts like one atom, albeit of a much larger size.

EBGs are designed to prevent the propagation of an allocated bandwidth of frequencies, for certain arrival angles and polarizations. Various geometries and structures have been proposed to fabricate EBG's special properties. In practice it is impossible to build a flawless EBG device.

EBGs have been manufactured for frequencies ranging from a few gigahertz (GHz) to a few terahertz (THz), radio, microwave and mid-infrared frequency regions. EBG application developments include a transmission line, woodpiles made of square dielectric bars and several different types of low gain antennas.

== Double positive medium ==
Double positive mediums (DPS) do occur in nature, such as naturally occurring dielectrics. Permittivity and magnetic permeability are both positive and wave propagation is in the forward direction. Artificial materials have been fabricated which combine DPS, ENG and MNG properties.

== Bi-isotropic and bianisotropic ==
Categorizing metamaterials into double or single negative, or double positive, normally assumes that the metamaterial has independent electric and magnetic responses described by ε and μ. However, in many cases, the electric field causes magnetic polarization, while the magnetic field induces electrical polarization, known as magnetoelectric coupling. Such media are denoted as bi-isotropic. Media that exhibit magnetoelectric coupling and that are anisotropic (which is the case for many metamaterial structures), are referred to as bi-anisotropic.

Four material parameters are intrinsic to magnetoelectric coupling of bi-isotropic media. They are the electric (E) and magnetic (H) field strengths, and electric (D) and magnetic (B) flux densities. These parameters are ε, μ, κ and χ or permittivity, permeability, strength of chirality, and the Tellegen parameter, respectively. In this type of media, material parameters do not vary with changes along a rotated coordinate system of measurements. In this sense they are invariant or scalar.

The intrinsic magnetoelectric parameters, κ and χ, affect the phase of the wave. The effect of the chirality parameter is to split the refractive index. In isotropic media this results in wave propagation only if ε and μ have the same sign. In bi-isotropic media with χ assumed to be zero, and κ a non-zero value, different results appear. Either a backward wave or a forward wave can occur. Alternatively, two forward waves or two backward waves can occur, depending on the strength of the chirality parameter.

In the general case, the constitutive relations for bi-anisotropic materials read $\mathbf{D} = \varepsilon \mathbf{E} + \xi \mathbf{H},$ $\mathbf{B} = \zeta \mathbf{E} + \mu \mathbf{H},$ where $\varepsilon$ and $\mu$ are the permittivity and the permeability tensors, respectively, whereas $\xi$ and $\zeta$ are the two magneto-electric tensors. If the medium is reciprocal, permittivity and permeability are symmetric tensors, and $\xi=-\zeta^T=-i \kappa^T$, where $\kappa$ is the chiral tensor describing chiral electromagnetic and reciprocal magneto-electric response. The chiral tensor can be expressed as $\kappa=\tfrac{1}{3}\operatorname{tr}(\kappa) I+N+J$, where $\operatorname{tr}(\kappa)$ is the trace of $\kappa$, I is the identity matrix, N is a symmetric trace-free tensor, and J is an antisymmetric tensor. Such decomposition allows us to classify the reciprocal bianisotropic response and we can identify the following three main classes: (i) chiral media ($\operatorname{tr}(\kappa) \neq 0, N \neq 0, J=0$), (ii) pseudochiral media ($\operatorname{tr}(\kappa) = 0, N \neq 0, J=0$), (iii) omega media ($\operatorname{tr}(\kappa) = 0, N = 0, J \neq 0$).

== Chiral ==
Handedness of metamaterials is a potential source of confusion as the metamaterial literature includes two conflicting uses of the terms left- and right-handed. The first refers to one of the two circularly polarized waves that are the propagating modes in chiral media. The second relates to the triplet of electric field, magnetic field and Poynting vector that arise in negative refractive index media, which in most cases are not chiral.

Generally a chiral and/or bianisotropic electromagnetic response is a consequence of 3D geometrical chirality: 3D-chiral metamaterials are composed by embedding 3D-chiral structures in a host medium and they show chirality-related polarization effects such as optical activity and circular dichroism. The concept of 2D chirality also exists and a planar object is said to be chiral if it cannot be superposed onto its mirror image unless it is lifted from the plane. 2D-chiral metamaterials that are anisotropic and lossy have been observed to exhibit directionally asymmetric transmission (reflection, absorption) of circularly polarized waves due to circular conversion dichroism. On the other hand, bianisotropic response can arise from geometrical achiral structures possessing neither 2D nor 3D intrinsic chirality. Plum and colleagues investigated magneto-electric coupling due to extrinsic chirality, where the arrangement of a (achiral) structure together with the radiation wave vector is different from its mirror image, and observed large, tuneable linear optical activity, nonlinear optical activity, specular optical activity and circular conversion dichroism. Rizza et al. suggested 1D chiral metamaterials where the effective chiral tensor is not vanishing if the system is geometrically one-dimensional chiral (the mirror image of the entire structure cannot be superposed onto it by using translations without rotations).

3D-chiral metamaterials are constructed from chiral materials or resonators in which the effective chirality parameter $\kappa$ is non-zero. Wave propagation properties in such chiral metamaterials demonstrate that negative refraction can be realized in metamaterials with a strong chirality and positive $\varepsilon_r$ and $\mu_r$. This is because the refractive index $n$ has distinct values for left and right circularly polarized waves, given by

$$n = \pm\sqrt{\varepsilon_r\mu_r} \pm \kappa$$

It can be seen that a negative index will occur for one polarization if $\kappa$ > $\sqrt{\varepsilon_r\mu_r}$. In this case, it is not necessary that either or both $\varepsilon_r$ and $\mu_r$ be negative for backward wave propagation. A negative refractive index due to chirality was first observed simultaneously and independently by Plum et al. and Zhang et al. in 2009.

== FSS based ==
Frequency selective surface-based metamaterials block signals in one waveband and pass those at another waveband. They have become an alternative to fixed frequency metamaterials. They allow for optional changes of frequencies in a single medium, rather than the restrictive limitations of a fixed frequency response.
