= Veselago =

Veselago is a Russian surname. Notable people with the surname include:

- Yegor Veselago (1770-1823), Russian naval captain-commander
- Feodosiy Veselago (1817-1895) - Russian naval historian
- Victor Veselago (1929—2018), Soviet and Russian physicist
