= Isotropic solid =

Solid material whose physical properties are independent of orientation

In condensed matter physics and continuum mechanics, an isotropic solid refers to a solid material for which physical properties are independent of the orientation of the system. While the finite sizes of atoms and bonding considerations ensure that true isotropy of atomic position will not exist in the solid state, it is possible for measurements of a given property to yield isotropic results, either due to the symmetries present within a crystal system, or due to the effects of orientational averaging over a sample (e.g. in an amorphous solid or a polycrystalline metal). Isotropic solids tend to be of interest when developing models for physical behavior of materials, as they tend to allow for dramatic simplifications of theory; for example, conductivity in metals of the cubic crystal system can be described with single scalar value, rather than a tensor. Additionally, cubic crystals are isotropic with respect to thermal expansion and will expand equally in all directions when heated.

Isotropy should not be confused with homogeneity, which characterizes a system’s properties as being independent of position, rather than orientation. Additionally, all crystal structures, including the cubic crystal system, are anisotropic with respect to certain properties, and isotropic to others (such as density). The anisotropy of a crystal’s properties depends on the rank of the tensor used to describe the property, as well as the symmetries present within the crystal. The rotational symmetries within cubic crystals, for example, ensure that the dielectric constant (a 2nd rank tensor property) will be equal in all directions, whereas the symmetries in hexagonal systems dictate that the measurement will vary depending on whether the measurement is made within the basal plane. Due to the relationship between the dielectric constant and the optical index of refraction, it would be expected for cubic crystals to be optically isotropic, and hexagonal crystals to be optically anisotropic; Measurements of the optical properties of cubic and hexagonal CdSe confirm this understanding.

Nearly all single crystal systems are anisotropic with respect to mechanical properties, with Tungsten being a very notable exception, as it is a cubic metal with stiffness tensor coefficients that exist in the proper ratio to allow for mechanical isotropy. In general, however, cubic crystals are not mechanically isotropic. However, many materials, such as structural steel, tend to be encountered and utilized in a polycrystalline state. Due to random orientation of the grains within the material, measured mechanical properties tend to be averages of the values associated with different crystallographic directions, with the net effect of apparent isotropy. As a result, it is typical for parameters such as the Young's Modulus to be reported independent of crystallographic direction. Treating solids as mechanically isotropic greatly simplifies analysis of deformation and fracture (as well as of the elastic fields produced by dislocations). However, preferential orientation of grains (called texture) can occur as a result of certain types of deformation and recrystallization processes, which will create anisotropy in mechanical properties of the solid.
