= Quantum metamaterial =

Type of material

Quantum metamaterials apply the science of metamaterials and the rules of quantum mechanics to control electromagnetic radiation. In the broad sense, a quantum metamaterial is a metamaterial in which certain quantum properties of the medium must be taken into account and whose behaviour is thus described by both Maxwell's equations and the Schrödinger equation. Its behaviour reflects the existence of both EM waves and matter waves. The constituents can be at nanoscopic or microscopic scales, depending on the frequency range (e.g., optical or microwave).

In a more strict approach, a quantum metamaterial should demonstrate coherent quantum dynamics. Such a system is essentially a spatially extended controllable quantum object that allows additional ways of controlling the propagation of electromagnetic waves.

Quantum metamaterials can be narrowly defined as optical media that:

- Are composed of quantum coherent unit elements with engineered parameters;
- Exhibit controllable quantum states of these elements;
- Maintain quantum coherence for longer than the traversal time of a relevant electromagnetic signal.

== Research ==
Fundamental research in quantum metamaterials creates opportunities for novel investigations in quantum phase transition, new perspectives on adiabatic quantum computation and a route to other quantum technology applications. Such a system is essentially a spatially-extended controllable quantum object that allows additional ways of controlling electromagnetic wave propagation.

In other words, quantum metamaterials incorporate quantum coherent states in order to control and manipulate electromagnetic radiation. With these materials, quantum information processing is combined with the science of metamaterials (periodic artificial electromagnetic materials). The unit cells can be imagined to function as qubits that maintain quantum coherence "long enough for the electromagnetic pulse to travel across". The quantum state is achieved through the material's individual cells. As each cell interacts with the propagating electromagnetic pulse, the whole system retains quantum coherence.

Several types of metamaterials are being studied. Nanowires can use quantum dots as the unit cells or artificial atoms of the structure, arranged as periodic nanostructures. This material demonstrates a negative index of refraction and effective magnetism and is simple to build. The radiated wavelength of interest is much larger than the constituent diameter. Another type uses periodically arranged cold atom cells, accomplished with ultra-cold gasses. A photonic bandgap can be demonstrated with this structure, along with tunability and control as a quantum system. Quantum metamaterial prototypes based on superconducting devices with and without Josephson junctions are being actively investigated. Recently a superconducting quantum metamaterial prototype based on flux qubits was realized.

== See also ==
- Negative index metamaterials
- Introduction to quantum mechanics
- Nanotechnology
- History of metamaterials
