= Vladimir Shalaev =

American optical physicist

Vladimir M. Shalaev
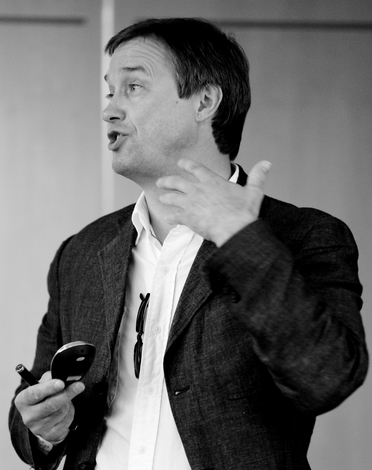
- Citizenship: United States
- Education: Krasnoyarsk State University, Russia
- Awards: Max Born Award, Optica (2010) Willis E. Lamb Award for Laser Science and Quantum Optics IEEE Photonics Society William Streifer Scientific Achievement Award Rolf Landauer Medal, ETOPIM International Association UNESCO Medal for the development of nanosciences and nanotechnologies Goodman Book Writing Award, OSA and SPIE Frank Isakson Prize for Optical Effects in Solids Member of the American Academy of Arts and Sciences Member of the National Academy of Engineering (NAE) Fellow of Professional Societies: OSA, IEEE, SPIE, APS, MRS.
- Scientific career
- Fields: Physics; Optics; Photonics; Optical nano-/metamaterials; Plasmonics; Quantum Photonics; Nanotechnology
- Workplaces: Purdue University
- Website: engineering.purdue.edu/~shalaev/

Vladimir (Vlad) M. Shalaev is a Distinguished Professor of Electrical and Computer Engineering and Scientific Director for Nanophotonics at Birck Nanotechnology Center, Purdue University.

== Education and career ==
V. Shalaev earned a Master of Science Degree in physics (summa cum laude) in 1979 from Krasnoyarsk State University (Russia) and a PhD Degree in physics and mathematics in 1983 from the same university. Over the course of his career, Shalaev received a number of awards for his research in the fields of nanophotonics and metamaterials, and he is a Fellow of several of Professional Societies (see the Awards, honors, memberships section below). Prof. Shalaev (with his h-index of 132, as of January 2026, and 77,000 citations, in total, according to Google Scholar) has nearly 1,000 publications in the field of science and technology, including 1 monograph and 2 co-authored books, 4 edited/co-edited books, 30 invited book chapters, and 50 USA patents. He is ranked #29 in electronics and electrical engineering among the USA researchers and #50 worldwide, according to Research.com website. Prof. Shalaev is ranked #22 in the “optics” category out of ~ 80,000 entries in the Stanford list of top 2% world’s highest-cited scientists (career-long). He is also recognized as Highly Cited Researcher (in physics) by the Web of Science Group for eight consecutive years, in 2017-2024.

== Research ==
Vladimir M. Shalaev is recognized for his pioneering studies on linear and nonlinear optics of random nanophotonic composites that had helped to mold the research area of composite optical media. He also contributed to the emergence of a new field of engineered, artificial materials - optical metamaterials. Currently, he studies new phenomena resulting from merging metamaterials and plasmonics with quantum nanophotonics.

=== Optical metamaterials ===
Optical metamaterials (MMs) are rationally designed composite nanostructured materials that exhibit unique electromagnetic properties drastically different from the properties of their constituent material components. Metamaterials offer remarkable tailorability of their electromagnetic response via shape, size, composition and morphology of their nanoscale building blocks sometimes called 'meta-atoms'. Shalaev proposed and demonstrated the first optical MM that exhibits negative index of refraction and the nanostructures that show artificial magnetism across the entire visible spectrum. (Here and thereafter, only selected, representative papers by Shalaev are cited; for complete list of Shalaev's publications visit his website.) He made important contributions to active, nonlinear and tunable metamaterials, which enable new ways of controlling light and accessing new regimes of enhanced light–matter interactions. Shalaev also experimentally realized negative-refractive-index MMs where optical gain medium is used to compensate for light absorption (optical loss). He made significant contributions to the so-called Transformation Optics, specifically on optical concentrators and "invisibility cloaks". In collaboration with Noginov, Shalaev demonstrated the smallest, 40-nm, nanolaser operating in the visible spectral range. Shalaev also made seminal contributions to two dimensional, flat metamaterials – metasurfaces – that introduce abrupt changes to the phase of light at a single interface via coupling to nanoscale optical antennas. He realized extremely compact flat lens, ultra-thin hologram and record-small circular dichroism spectrometer compatible with planar optical circuitry. MM designs developed by Shalaev are now broadly employed for research in sub-wavelength optical imaging, nanoscale lasers, and novel sensors.

Shalaev’s work had a strong impact on the whole field of metamaterials. Three of Shalaev’s papers - Refs.,, and - remain among the top 50 most-cited out of over 750,000 papers included in the ISI Web of Science OPTICS category since 2005 (as of January 2021).

=== Random composites ===
Shalaev made pioneering contributions to the area of random optical media, including fractal and percolation composites. He predicted the highly localized optical modes -'hot spots' - for fractals and percolating films which were later experimentally demonstrated by Shalaev in collaboration with the Moskovits and Boccara groups. Furthermore, he showed that the hot spots in fractal and percolation random composites are related to localization of surface plasmons.^{−} These localized surface plasmon modes in random systems are sometimes referred to as Shalaev's "hot spots": see e.g. This research on random composites stemmed from the early studies on fractals performed by Shalaev in collaboration with M. I. Stockman; a theory of random metal-dielectric films was worked out in collaboration with A. K. Sarychev. Shalaev also developed fundamental theories of surface-enhanced Raman scattering (SERS) and strongly-enhanced optical nonlinearities in fractals and percolation systems and led experimental studies aimed to verify the developed theories.^{−} Shalaev also predicted that nonlinear phenomena in random systems can be enhanced not only because of the high local fields in hot spots but also due to the rapid, nanoscale spatial variation of these fields in the vicinity of hot spots, which serves as a source of additional momentum and thus enables indirect electronic transitions.

Shalaev’s contributions to the optics and plasmonics of random media^{−} helped transform those concepts into the area of optical metamaterials.^{−}^{−} Owing to the theory and experimental approaches developed in the area of random composites, optical metamaterials have become a mature research field rich in new physics. Shalaev’s impact on the development of both fields is in identifying the strong synergy and close connection between these two frontier fields of optics that unlock an entirely new set of physical properties.

=== New Materials for Nanophotonics and Plasmonics ===
Random composites and metamaterials provide a unique opportunity to tailor their optical properties via shape, size and composition of their nanoscale building blocks, which often require metals to confine light down to the nanometer scale via the excitation of surface plasmons. To enable practical applications of plasmonics, Shalaev in collaboration with A. Boltasseva developed novel plasmonic materials, namely transition metal nitrides and transparent conducting oxides (TCOs), paving the way to durable, low-loss, and CMOS-compatible plasmonic and nanophotonic devices. The proposed plasmonic ceramics operating at high temperatures, can offer solutions to highly efficient energy conversion, photocatalysis and data storage technologies^{−}. In collaboration with the Faccio group, Shalaev demonstrated ultrafast, strongly-enhanced nonlinear responses in TCOs that possess an extremely low (close to zero) linear refractive index – the so-called epsilon-near-zero regime. Independently, the Boyd group obtained equally remarkable results in a TCO material, demonstrating that low-index TCOs hold a promise for novel nonlinear optics.

=== Early research ===
Shalaev’s PhD work (supervised by Prof. A.K. Popov) and early research involved theoretical analysis of resonant interaction of laser radiation with gaseous media, in particular i) Doppler-free multi-photon processes in strong optical fields and their applications in nonlinear optics spectroscopy and laser physics as well as ii) the (newly-discovered then) phenomenon of light-induced drift of gases.

== Awards, honors, memberships ==
- Member of the American Academy of Arts and Sciences
- Member of the National Academy of Engineering (NAE)
- Recognized as Highly Cited Researcher by the Web of Science Group in 2017-2024
- Ranked #22 in the “optics” category out of ~ 80,000 in the Stanford list of top 2% world’s highest-cited scientists (career-long)
- Ranked #29 in electronics and electrical engineering among the USA researchers and #50 worldwide, according to Research.com
- The 2020 Frank Isakson Prize for Optical Effects in Solids
- The Optical Society of America Max Born Award, 2010
- The Willis E. Lamb Award for Laser Science and Quantum Optics, 2010
- IEEE Photonics Society William Streifer Scientific Achievement Award, 2015
- Rolf Landauer Medal of the ETOPIM (Electrical, Transport and Optical Properties of Inhomogeneous Media) International Association, 2015
- The 2012 Nanotechnology Award from UNESCO
- The 2014 Goodman Book Award from OSA and SPIE
- Honorary Doctorate from University of Southern Denmark, 2015
- The 2006 Top 50 Nano Technology Award Winner for “Nanorod Material”
- The 2009 McCoy Award, Purdue University's highest honor for scientific achievement
- Fellow of the Materials Research Society (MRS), since 2015
- Fellow of the Institute of Electrical and Electronics Engineers (IEEE), since 2010
- Fellow of the American Physical Society (APS), since 2002
- Fellow of the Optical Society of America (OSA), since 2003
- Fellow of the International Society for Optical Engineering (SPIE), since 2005
- General co-Chair for 2011 and Program co-Chair 2009 of CLEO/QELS conferences
- Chair of the OSA Technical Group “Photonic Metamaterials”, 2004 - 2010
- Reviewing Editor for Science Science Magazine
- Co-Editor of Applied Physics B - Lasers and Optics, 2006 - 2013
- Topical Editor for Journal of Optical Society of America B, 2005–2011
- Editorial Board Member for Nanophotonics journal, since 2012
- Editorial Advisory Board Member for Laser and Photonics Reviews, since 2008

== Publications ==
Prof. Shalaev co-/authored three- and co-/edited four books in the area of his scientific expertise. According to Shalaev's website, over the course of his career he contributed 30 invited chapters to various scientific anthologies and published a number of invited review articles, over 800 publications in total. He made over 500 invited presentations at International Conferences and leading research centers, including a number of plenary and keynote talks.

== Family ==
Spouse: Alexandra Boltasseva
