= Victor Veselago =

Soviet/Russian physicist

Victor Georgievich Veselago
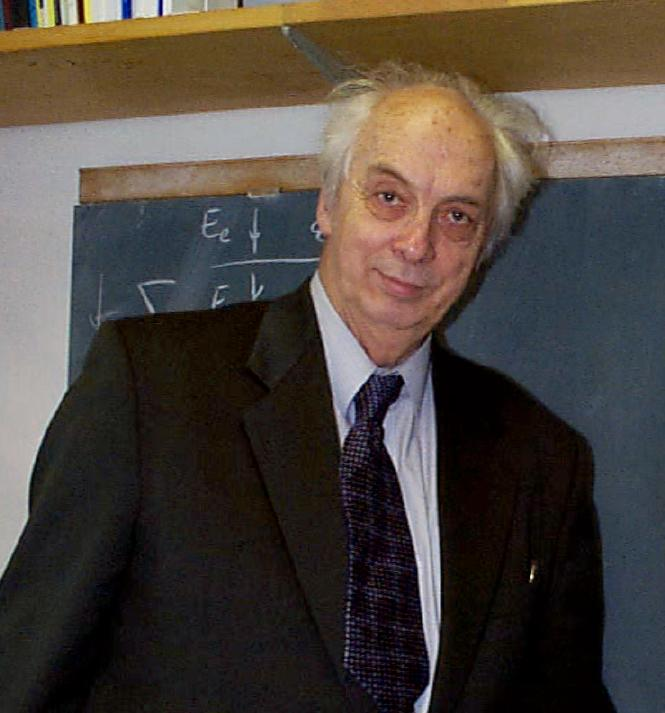
- Veselago c. 2006
- Born: June 13, 1929; Kichkas, Zaporozhye Oblast, Ukrainian SSR, Soviet Union
- Died: September 15, 2018 (aged 89); Russian Federation
- Education: Moscow Institute of Physics and Technology
- Known for: Metamaterials
- Scientific career
- Fields: Physics
- Workplaces: Moscow Institute of Physics and Technology

Victor Georgievich Veselago (Russian: Виктор Гиоргиевич Веселаго; 13 June 1929 – 15 September 2018) was a Soviet Russian physicist, doctor of physical and mathematical sciences, and a university professor. In 1967, he was the first to publish a theoretical analysis of materials with negative permittivity, ε, and permeability, μ.

He published his seminal work in a paper entitled "The Electrodynamics of Substances with Simultaneously Negative Values of ε and μ". It was first published in Russian (1967), and was later translated into English (1968). His published paper was key to the advancement of physics research in electrodynamics and optics. It has been cited 4118 times by other scientific works, according to Cross ref and 15,378 times according to Google Scholar as of February 2024.

He received awards and continued to contribute to electrodynamics throughout his career.

== Background ==
In the senior years of his high school he was an avid ham radio amateur. This hobby sparked an interest in the workings of electricity, and more generally, an interest in physics. Veselago enrolled in the Physico-Technical Department, of M.V. Lomonosov Moscow State University. This department had at that time was just recently opened at this university. He matriculated for four years there. These university years were the happiest time of his life.

Professor Mark Yefremovich Zhabotinsky supervised Veselago's project for his graduation diploma. This same professor also helped him to build a foundation in radio electronics and electrodynamics. Also, as a result of reading the book "What is radio?", which popularized the subject he became involved in the amateur field of Ham Radio. Veselago then studied under the author of the book, Professor Semen Emmanuilovich Khaikin, for three summers at the P N Lebedev FIAN Radioastronomy Station in Crimea. He also studied under Professor Sergei Mikhailovich Rytov, corresponding member of the USSR Academy of Sciences, who lectured on the theory of oscillations. These three professors had a notable impact on Veselago.

It appears that the most significant event of his career, and the most important moment in his life was when he realized that materials with both negative permittivity and permeability are possible.

He was also on the advisory board of the peer reviewed journal Metamaterials, along with a number of other notable board members who have significantly contributed to metamaterial research. The journal was first published in March, 2007.

In 2009, Victor Vesalgo won the C.E.K. Mees Medal from the Optical Society of America (OSA). The recipient is awarded this medal because he or she "exemplifies the thought that 'optics transcends all boundaries,' interdisciplinary and international alike." He was also a Fellow of OSA.

== Results and importance of first published work ==
His first paper was "The Electrodynamics of Substances with Simultaneously Negative Values of ε and μ". Up to this point, the refractive index was traditionally regarded as having only positive values. In this paper he was able to show that refractive index may also be negative. He hypothesized that negative refraction can occur if both the (electric) permittivity and the magnetic permeability of a material are negative. This prediction was confirmed 33 years later when David Smith et al., created a composite material with negative refractive index. Veselago also predicted a flat plate consisting of these materials will produce some curved lens properties. Sir John Pendry demonstrated this prediction in the lab and noted greatly improved optical resolution. This has been named the Veselago lens.

After Smith's and Pendry's accomplishments with metamaterials, Veselago realized that the most important contribution of his original paper is not that a composite material can be designed to produce a negative refraction, but that a composite material can be designed to produce any value for permittivity and permeability. At least a part of his research goals was then to critically reconsider all formulas of classical electrodynamics that involve permittivity, permeability or refractive index. The fact that prior research is based on positive values for these parameters leads to erroneous solutions when negative values are considered or researched. He stated that many of these formulas need to be corrected.

Veselago perceived that the next big breakthrough with metamaterials will be the fabrication of transparent low-absorption metamaterials with negative refraction in the visible spectrum range.

== Education ==
Victor Veselago attended Moscow University and graduated from there in 1952. He received his PhD in 1959 for investigation of molecular spectra with radiospectropy. He later received a Doctor of Science degree in Solid State Physics in 1974 for his investigation of solid states in magnetic fields. His doctorate and Doctor of Science degree were both achieved at the P.N. Lebedev Physical Institute, where he worked (see Career section below).

== Career ==
After graduating Moscow University in 1952, he went to work with the P.N. Lebedev Physical Institute of the Russian Academy of Sciences in Moscow. He was there from 1952 to 1983. In 1983 he became Head of Laboratory of Magnetic Materials in the Lebedev Physical Institute.

In 1980 he became a professor of applied physics for the Moscow Institute of Physics and Technology. Moreover, he was noted to have been mainly interested in the sciences of magnetism, solid-state physics, and electrodynamics.

Besides notable work establishing and publishing the theory of negative refraction in electrodynamics from 1966 to 1972 he is a winner of the State Prize for Science of the USSR (1976), and a winner of the academician V.A. Fock prize (2004), and an Honored Scientist of the Russian Federation(2002). In 2011, Professor Victor G. Veselago was nominated for the Nobel Prize. In 2007, he was actively involved as an expert for the Russian Foundation for Fundamental Research, the Russian Foundation for Humanitarian Research, and was the vice-chairman of the physics department of the Supreme Attestation Committee of Russia (VAK). He was a founder and vice-editor of the electronic Russian scientific journal "Исследовано в России" ("Investigated in Russia").

V. Veselago was married and had three daughters along with one son. His favorite animal was a female cat named Fifa. His notable hobby was real railways, not hobby sets.

== See also ==
- Metamaterials
- Negative index metamaterials
- Photonic crystal
- 2009 recipient of the OSA
- Kenneth Mees Medal
