= Metamaterials (journal) =

- Discipline: Materials science
- Language: English
- Edited by: Mikhail Lapine

Publication details
- History: 2007–2013
- Publisher: Elsevier
- Frequency: Quarterly

Standard abbreviations
- ISO 4: Metamaterials

Indexing
- ISSN: 1873-1988
- OCLC no.: 86110990

Links
- Journal homepage; Online archive

Metamaterials was a quarterly peer-reviewed scientific journal that was established in March 2007. It was published by Elsevier and the founding editor-in-chief was Mikhail Lapine (Helsinki University of Technology). The journal published special issues occasionally. It covered research concerning metamaterials, such as artificial electromagnetic materials, which includes various types of composite periodic structures and frequency selective surfaces in the microwave and optical range. The journal was abstracted and indexed in Scopus. It was discontinued in 2013.

== See also ==
- History of metamaterials
- Negative index metamaterials
