= Homogeneity (physics) =

Uniformity of a material or system at every point

In physics, a homogeneous material or system has the same properties at every point; it is uniform without irregularities. A uniform electric field (which has the same strength and the same direction at each point) would be compatible with homogeneity (all points experience the same physics). A material constructed with different constituents can be described as effectively homogeneous in the electromagnetic materials domain, when interacting with a directed radiation field (light, microwave frequencies, etc.).

Mathematically, homogeneity has the connotation of invariance, as all components of the equation have the same degree of value whether or not each of these components are scaled to different values, for example, by multiplication or addition. Cumulative distribution fits this description. "The state of having identical cumulative distribution function or values".

== Context ==
The definition of homogeneous strongly depends on the context used. For example, a composite material is made up of different individual materials, known as "constituents" of the material, but may be defined as a homogeneous material when assigned a function. For example, asphalt paves our roads, but is a composite material consisting of asphalt binder and mineral aggregate, and then laid down in layers and compacted. However, homogeneity of materials does not necessarily mean isotropy. In the previous example, a composite material may not be isotropic.

In another context, a material is not homogeneous in so far as it is composed of atoms and molecules. However, at the normal level of our everyday world, a pane of glass, or a sheet of metal is described as glass, or stainless steel. In other words, these are each described as a homogeneous material.

A few other instances of context are: homogeneity (in space) implies conservation of momentum; and homogeneity in time implies conservation of energy.

=== Homogeneous alloy ===
In the context of composite metals is an alloy. A blend of a metal with one or more metallic or nonmetallic materials is an alloy. The components of an alloy do not combine chemically but, rather, are very finely mixed. An alloy might be homogeneous or might contain small particles of components that can be viewed with a microscope. Brass is an example of an alloy, being a homogeneous mixture of copper and zinc. Another example is steel, which is an alloy of iron with carbon and possibly other metals. The purpose of alloying is to produce desired properties in a metal that naturally lacks them. Brass, for example, is harder than copper and has a more gold-like color. Steel is harder than iron and can even be made rust proof (stainless steel).

=== Homogeneous cosmology ===
Homogeneity, in another context plays a role in cosmology. From the perspective of 19th-century cosmology (and before), the universe was infinite, unchanging, homogeneous, and therefore filled with stars. However, German astronomer Heinrich Olbers asserted that if this were true, then the entire night sky would be filled with light and bright as day; this is known as Olbers' paradox. Olbers presented a technical paper in 1826 that attempted to answer this conundrum. The faulty premise, unknown in Olbers' time, was that the universe is not infinite, static, and homogeneous. The Big Bang cosmology replaced this model (expanding, finite, and inhomogeneous universe). However, modern astronomers supply reasonable explanations to answer this question. One of at least several explanations is that distant stars and galaxies are red shifted, which weakens their apparent light and makes the night sky dark. However, the weakening is not sufficient to actually explain Olbers' paradox. Many cosmologists think that the fact that the Universe is finite in time, that is that the Universe has not been around forever, is the solution to the paradox. The fact that the night sky is dark is thus an indication for the Big Bang.

== Translation invariance ==
By translation invariance, one means independence of (absolute) position, especially when referring to a law of physics, or to the evolution of a physical system.

Fundamental laws of physics should not (explicitly) depend on position in space. That would make them quite useless. In some sense, this is also linked to the requirement that experiments should be reproducible. This principle is true for all laws of mechanics (Newton's laws, etc.), electrodynamics, quantum mechanics, etc.

In practice, this principle is usually violated, since one studies only a small subsystem of the universe, which of course "feels" the influence of the rest of the universe. This situation gives rise to "external fields" (electric, magnetic, gravitational, etc.) which make the description of the evolution of the system depend upon its position (potential wells, etc.). This only stems from the fact that the objects creating these external fields are not considered as (a "dynamical") part of the system.

Translational invariance as described above is equivalent to shift invariance in system analysis, although here it is most commonly used in linear systems, whereas in physics the distinction is not usually made.

The notion of isotropy, for properties independent of direction, is not a consequence of homogeneity. For example, a uniform electric field (i.e., which has the same strength and the same direction at each point) would be compatible with homogeneity (at each point physics will be the same), but not with isotropy, since the field singles out one "preferred" direction.

=== Consequences ===
In the Lagrangian formalism, homogeneity in space implies conservation of momentum, and homogeneity in time implies conservation of energy. This is shown, using variational calculus, in standard textbooks like the classical reference text of Landau & Lifshitz. This is a particular application of Noether's theorem.

== See also ==
- Translational invariance
- Miscibility
- Phase (matter)
