= Ulf Leonhardt =

German physicist (born 1965)

FRSE Ulf Leonhardt
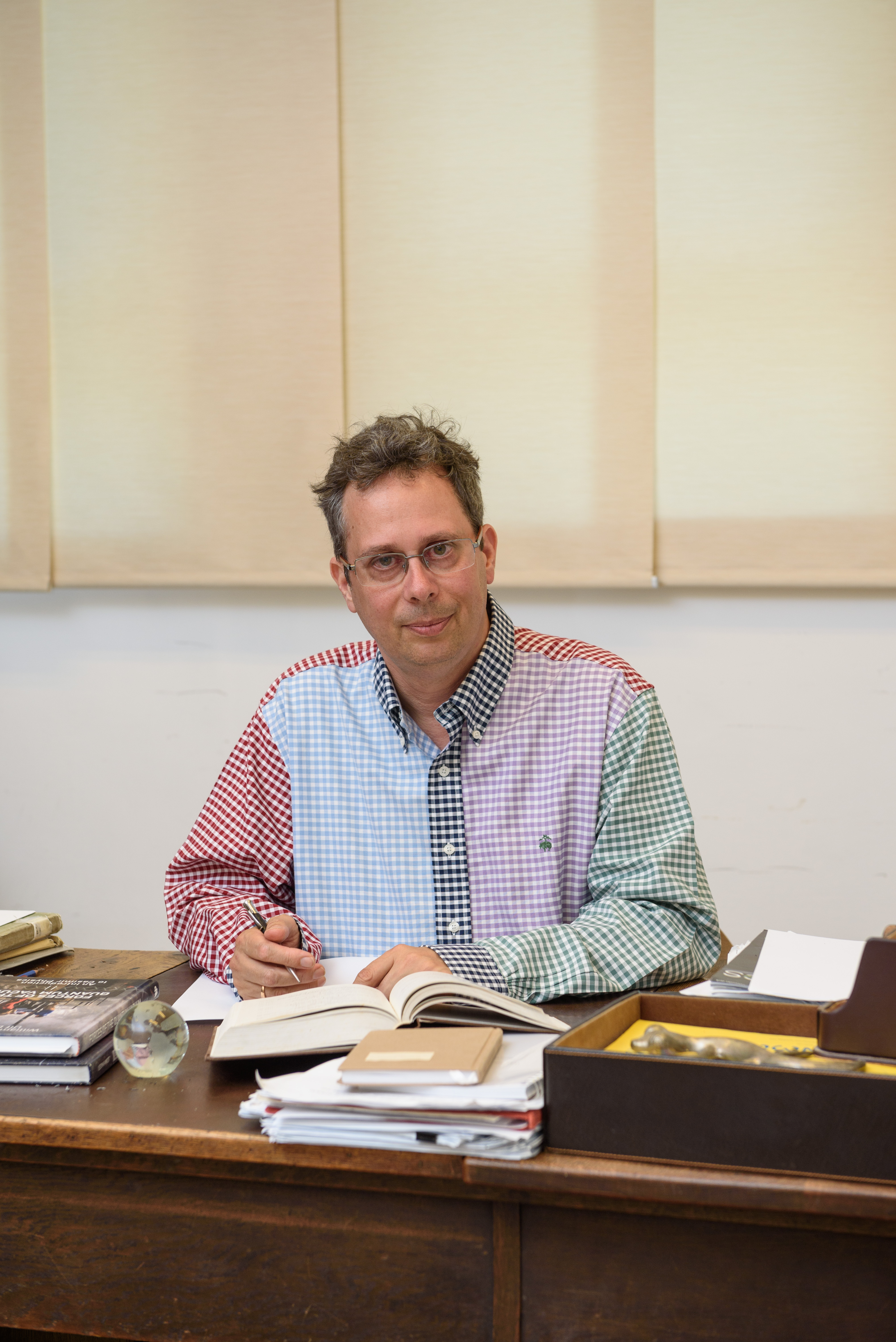
- Leonhardt in 2018
- Born: October 9, 1965 (age 60); Bad Schlema, East Germany
- Education: University of Jena; Humboldt University of Berlin
- Known for: Metamaterial cloaking; Transformation optics
- Scientific career
- Fields: Physics
- Institutions: University of Ulm; KTH Royal Institute of Technology; University of St Andrews; Weizmann Institute of Science
- Thesis: Quantum theory of simple optical instruments (1993)
- Website: ulfleonhardt.weizmann.ac.il

Ulf Leonhardt, FRSE (born 9 October 1965) is a German scientist. In 2006, he published the first scientific paper on invisibility cloaking with metamaterials at the same time Pendry's group published their paper in the journal Science. He has been involved with the science of cloaking objects since then.

He is a Wolfson Research Merit Award holder from the Royal Society, and he is currently Professor of Physics at the Weizmann Institute of Science. He is involved in research pertaining to metamaterials. Specific disciplines are quantum electrodynamics in media, perfect imaging, optical analogues of the event horizon, reverse Casimir effect, metamaterial cloaking, quantum effects of optical phenomena involving Hawking radiation and light in moving media.

== Education and career ==
Leonhardt studied physics at the University of Jena and the Moscow State University and received his diploma in physics in 1990 at the University of Jena. In 1993, he earned a PhD in theoretical physics from the Humboldt University of Berlin, and stayed at the Max Planck Research Group for Nonclassical Radiation in Berlin headed by Harry Paul as a research associate until 1995. From 1995 to 1996, Leonhardt was a visiting scholar at the Oregon Center for Optics of the University of Oregon. He returned to Germany after the visit and in 1998, he completed his habilitation at the University of Ulm. From 1998 to 2000 he was in Stockholm at the Royal Institute of Technology as a Göran-Gustafsson Fellow. He held the chair (theoretical physics) at the University of St Andrews in Scotland between April, 2000 and 2012. Since 2012, he has relocated to Israel and become a Professor of Physics at the Weizmann Institute of Science.

=== China Experiences ===
Leonhardt ventured into China in 2011 to collaborate with researchers and academics. In particular, he participated in China's "Thousand Talent Program" and the "Guangzhou Leading Overseas Talent" program. Such programs come with both individual cash bonus and research funding. Ulf was hosted by a research center at South China Normal University in Guangzhou, China and in 2012, he was awarded funding for both programs. However, Leonhardt later realized there were possible foul play with the award money by his China counterparts. He later engaged a lawyer to investigate and Science magazine published an article entitled "Show me the Money?" in October 2014 to reveal more on the insights. Various news media began to cover on this topic to warn foreign researchers and academics to be extra careful with foreign work contracts and in award funds handling and administration.

Around half a year later, in a later issue of Science magazine in 2015, Langping He, the Deputy Dean of the Centre for Optical and Electromagnetic Research (COER) and Academy of Advanced Optoelectronics, South China Normal University, published a response letter titled A Chinese physics institute's defense. In the response letter, the COER side addressed many allegations in the earlier article.

== Awards and honors ==
Leonhardt is a Fellow of the Institute of Physics. He is also a Fellow of the Royal Society of Edinburgh. He is a recipient of the Otto Hahn Award of the Max Planck Society. In August 2009, the Royal Society's Theo Murphy Blue Skies award allowed Leonhardt to research a new theory for applying metamaterials to optical cloaking full-time.

== Books authored ==
Leonhardt has authored, coauthored or edited the following books:

- Ulf Leonhardt (March 2010). Essential Quantum Optics: From Quantum Measurements to Black Holes. Cambridge University Press. ISBN 978-0-521-14505-3. 277 pages.
- Ulf Leonhardt and Thomas Philbin (2010). Geometry and Light. The Science of Invisibility. Dover Publications, Inc. ISBN 978-0-486-47693-3. 278 pages.
- Ulf Leonhardt (October 1997). Measuring the Quantum State of Light. Cambridge Studies in Modern Optics. Cambridge University Press. p. 1. ISBN 978-0-521-49730-5. "Measuring the Quantum State of Light." 208 pages. PDF available here.

== See also ==
Metamaterial scientists

- Andrea Alù
- Christophe Caloz
- Nader Engheta
- George V. Eleftheriades
- Ismo Lindell
- John Pendry
- Vladimir Shalaev
- Ari H. Sihvola
- David R. Smith
- Costas Soukoulis
- Victor Veselago
- Richard W. Ziolkowski

Past artificial material scientists

- Jagadish Chandra Bose
- Horace Lamb
- Winston E. Kock
- Karl F. Lindman
- Leonid Mandelstam
- Walter Rotman
- Sergei Schelkunoff
- Arthur Schuster
