= Richard W. Ziolkowski =

American electrical engineer and academic

- Born: November 22, 1952 (age 73); Warsaw, New York, U.S.
- Education: Brown University; University of Illinois at Urbana-Champaign
- Scientific career
- Fields: Electromagnetics; Photonics; Metamaterials
- Workplaces: Lawrence Livermore National Laboratory; University of Arizona; University of Technology Sydney
- Thesis: The Maslov method and the asymptotic Fourier transform: Caustic analysis (1980)
- Doctoral advisor: Georges A. Deschamps

Richard W. Ziolkowski is an American electrical engineer and academician, who was the president of the IEEE Antennas and Propagation Society (2005), and a former vice president of this same society (2004). In 2006, he became an OSA Fellow. He is also an IEEE Fellow. He was born on November 22, 1952, in Warsaw, New York.

== Career ==
Ziolkowski has a dual appointment at the University of Arizona. He is a professor of electrical and computer engineering, and a professor of the optical sciences. He has been a full professor of electrical and computer engineering since 1996. Has been a professor of optical sciences since 2006. In 1990, he began at the University of Arizona as an associate professor in the department of Electrical and Computer Engineering. During his time at this university he was awarded the Kenneth Von Behren Chaired Professor (2003–2005) and is currently the Litton Industries John M. Leonis Distinguished Professor.

Before his first position at the University of Arizona, he was employed by Lawrence Livermore National Laboratory from 1981 to 1990.

=== 2010-present ===
In 2012, he was awarded an Honorary Doctorate from the Technical University of Denmark (DTU), in recognition of “outstanding and seminal contributions to metamaterial-inspired antennas.” The ceremony was attended by Queen Margrethe II of Denmark and the US Ambassador to Denmark, Laurie S. Fulton.

From 2014 to 2015, Ziolkowski was the Fulbright Distinguished Chair in Advanced Science and Technology for the Australian Defense Science and Technology Organization, where he conducted research on metamaterial-engineered structures and how these structures can be used to control scattering and absorption of electromagnetic and acoustic waves.

As of 2016, Ziolkowski is serving as a distinguished professor at the University of Technology Sydney (UTS), in Sydney, Australia, where he is continuing his metamaterials research.

== Education and training ==
At Brown University, in 1974, Richard Ziolkowski earned an Sc.B degree in physics, magna cum laude with honors. He then attended the University of Illinois at Urbana-Champaign. There he received both his M.S. and Ph.D. degrees in physics, in 1975 and 1980, respectively. While earning his graduate degrees, Ziolkowski was also a Graduate Teaching Assistant (1974–1977) and then Graduate Research Assistant (1975–1976). During his doctoral studies, he was supervised by Georges A. Deschamps.

== Society memberships ==
His academic and research achievement, can be reflected by his membership in the engineering honor society Tau Beta Pi, the honor society of research scientists and engineers Sigma Xi, and the multidisciplinary, academic, honor society Phi Kappa Phi.

Richard Ziolkowski is also a current member of the IEEE Antennas and Propagation Society, the IEEE Microwave Theory and Techniques Society, and the American Physical Society.

Concurrently he is also a member of United States segment of International Union of Radio Science (URSI). Regarding URSI, Ziolkowski's membership is more specifically - commission B of URSI, which focuses on fields, waves, electromagnetic theory, and their applications - and commission D of URSI, which focuses on electronics and photonics.

He is also a current member of the Optical Society of America, and the Acoustical Society of America.

== Invited speaker ==
Professor Ziolkowski has received technical recognition for his work as an invited speaker and invited lecturer in various venues.

=== 2009 ===
In 2009, Professor Ziolkowski was an invited lecturer at CEA Cesta (France), a European workshop on metamaterials (Rome), Metamaterials 2009 (London), Institute for Infocomm Research (Singapore), a metamaterials workshop (Madrid), ETOPIM 8 (Crete), metamaterials workshop (Los Alamos), IWAT 2009 (in Santa Monica, Ca.), and ANTEM / URSI 2009 (Canada).

=== 2008 ===
In 2008, he was an invited speaker (or lecturer) at A*STAR Metamaterials Workshop (Singapore), ISAP 2008 (Taipei), XII School on Metamaterials (Spain), XI School on Metamaterials (Marrakesh, Morocco), Europe SPIE Conference 6987 (Strasbourg, France), and Northeastern University (January 24).

=== 2007 ===
In 2007, he was an invited speaker (or lecturer) at the University of Toronto, ISAP 2007 (Niigata, Japan), IWAT 2007 (Cambridge, UK), and NANOMETA 2007(Austria).

== Service positions ==
Ziolkowski has served in the following positions:

- Chairperson, IEEE Electromagnetics Award Committee (2008–2010)
- IEEE Antennas and Propagation Society, President, 2005
- IEEE Antennas and Propagation Society, Vice President, 2004
- University of Arizona Faculty Honor Marshall, Commencement May 2005
- University of Arizona Faculty Honor Marshall, Commencement December 2004
- Chairman for Subcommittee IV: Nanostructure Photonics of Optical Society of America from 2000 to 2001
- Secretary for the United States segment of the URSI Commission D from 2000 to 2002
- Secretary for the United States segment of the URSI Commission B from 1994 to 1996
- Vice Chairman for the joint international symposium of URSI and IEEE Antennas and Propagation Society 1989
- Chairman of the Technical Activities Committee of the United States segment URSI Commission B from 1996 to 1999

== Awards and honors ==
Ziolkowski has received the following awards:

- Professional society awards:

- APS Fellow, 2016
- OSA Fellow, 2006
- IEEE Fellow, 1994

- Teaching awards

- IEEE and ΗΚΝ Outstanding Teaching Award (Senior Faculty) 1998
- IEEE and ΗΚΝ Outstanding Teaching Award 1993
- Tau Beta Pi Professor of the Year Award 1993

- University of Arizona service awards

- Litton Industries John M. Leonis Distinguished Professor from March 2007 to the present
- University of Arizona Kenneth Von Behren Chaired Professor, November 2003 – July 2005
- University of Arizona New Traditional Outstanding Advisor Recognition 1994

== Published works ==
Ziolkowski received recognition for best paper in several venues. In August 2007 he received the Best Paper Award at the International Symposium on Antennas and Propagation (Niigata, Japan). In April 2006 he received the CST University Publication Award. Also in 2006 he received recognition from the Institute of Electronics, Information and Communication Engineers for the Best Review Paper Award.

Professor Ziolkowski is a co-author and co-editor of Metamaterials: Physics and Engineering Explorations with Nader Engheta. He is also a contributor to other books.

=== Current areas of research ===
Among other research areas, his research covers metamaterial-engineered antennas This includes configurations and combinations of single-negative metamaterials, double-negative metamaterials, and naturally occurring materials. The study of these materials pertains to how these may affect scatterers, radiators, fields, resonators, gain, and further miniaturization. He has authored and co-authored over 30 papers (2005–2010) related to this area.

His inquiries also cover fundamental research in metamaterials by studying how the properties of these materials, and their use, may affect various electromagnetic devices.

=== Highly cited articles ===
Citations rates for some peer-reviewed articles authored by Professor Ziolkowski have surpassed 1000 citations. For example, his 2001 article published in Physical Review E is cited more than 1264 times. His book "Metamaterials: Physics and Engineering Explorations" has been cited more than 2533 times. In another instance, a 2003 paper that Professor Ziolkowski published in IEEE Transactions on Antennas and Propagation has over 1029 citations. Finally, IEEE Transactions on Microwave Theory and Techniques published a 2005 paper, by this author, which currently has a citation rate of more than 200.

== See also ==
Metamaterial scientists

- Andrea Alù
- Nader Engheta
- George V. Eleftheriades
- Ulf Leonhardt
- Ismo V. Lindell
- John Pendry
- Vladimir Shalaev
- Ari H. Sihvola
- David R. Smith
- Costas Soukoulis
- Sergei A. Tretyakov
- Victor Veselago

Past artificial material scientists

- Jagadish Chandra Bose
- Horace Lamb
- Winston E. Kock
- Karl F. Lindman
- Leonid Mandelstam
- Walter Rotman
- Sergei Schelkunoff
- Arthur Schuster
