= Winston E. Kock =

American electrical engineer

Winston Edward Kock
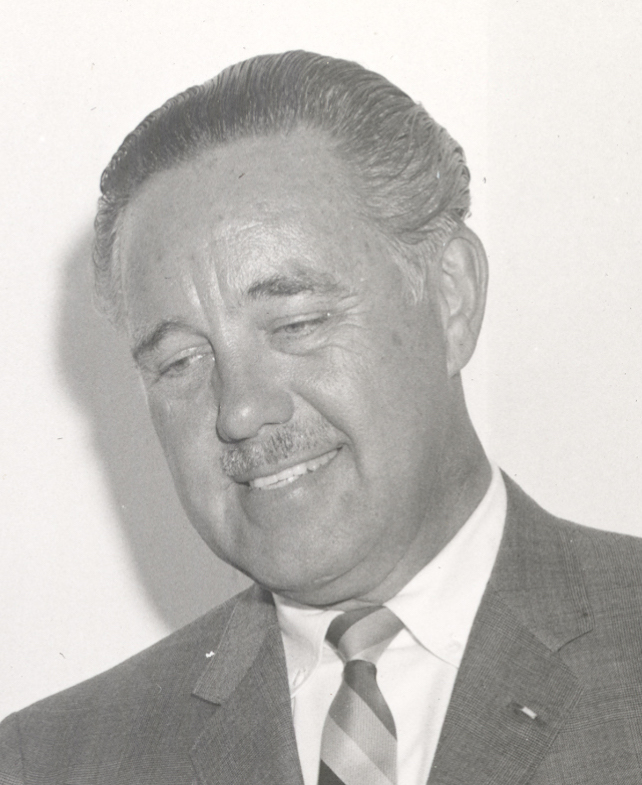
- Kock c. 1960s
- Born: December 5, 1909; Cincinnati, Ohio, U.S.
- Died: November 25, 1982 (aged 72); Ann Arbor, Michigan, U.S.
- Other name: Wayne Kirk
- Education: College of Music of Cincinnati; University of Cincinnati; University of Berlin
- Known for: First director of NASA Electronics Research Center; Artificial dielectrics
- Scientific career
- Fields: Electrical engineering
- Workplaces: AT&T Bell Laboratories; NASA Electronics Research Center; Bendix Corporation
- Academic advisors: Max von Laue; Arthur Wehnelt

Winston Edward Kock (December 5, 1909 – November 25, 1982) was an American electrical engineer and musician, who was the first Director of NASA Electronics Research Center (NASA ERC) in Cambridge, Massachusetts, from September 1, 1964, to October 1, 1966. The center was created for multidisciplinary scientific research, its proximity to certain colleges, its proximity to a local U.S. Air Force research facility, and was perceived as part of the nation's cold War effort.

Kock was also a novelist under the pseudonym Wayne Kirk. Kock also wrote books about topics in engineering and acoustics. These included radar, sonar, holography, and lasers. Kock's seminal research in artificial dielectrics, carried out at AT&T Bell Laboratories in the 1940s, is a historical connection to metamaterials.

== Early life and education ==
Winston Edward Kock was born on December 5, 1909 in Cincinnati, Ohio. At age four Kock started learning piano, and by high school he could play full recitals. In college he began composing music. He then took electrical engineering courses at the University of Cincinnati and continued studying piano and organ at the College of Music of Cincinnati. In the 1930s, as partial fulfillment of his bachelor's degree, he built an electronic organ. He used the more economical neon glow tubes for his electronic organ rather than radio vacuum tubes as sources for tones. In 1932 he received his B.S. degree in electrical engineering. For his master's degree thesis Kock grappled with the problem of pitch stabilization for 70 neon tubes in an electronic organ. In 1933 he received his Master of Science degree.

In 1934, he received his Ph.D. in experimental and theoretical physics from the University of Berlin. His examiners were Professors Max von Laue and Arthur Wehnelt. As part of the thesis, Kock, together with another candidate, developed an improved design for an electronic organ based on the formant principle. After obtaining his doctorate, he became a teaching fellow at University of Cincinnati for a year, and was briefly affiliated with Institute for Advanced Study and Indian Institute of Science.

== Career ==
Following his doctoral studies, Kock became the director of electronic research and development at Baldwin Piano Company. Subsequently, he became a researcher for Bell Laboratories. Part of his work there involved artificial dielectrics. He proposed metallic and wire lenses for antennas. Some of these are the metallic delay lens, parallel-wire lens, and the wire mesh lens. In addition, he conducted analytical studies regarding the response of customized metallic particles to a quasistatic, electromagnetic radiation field. Kock noted behaviors and structure in these artificial materials.

Before becoming Director of NASA Electronics Research Center he was vice-president research of the Bendix Corporation in Detroit. After leaving the Director's position, he returned to Bendix as vice-president and chief scientist. He continued at NASA as a member of the Administration Committee. Following his retirement from Electronics Research Center, he also acted as the Director of Basic and Applied Sciences at his alma mater, University of Cincinnati, where he was also a visiting professor of engineering.

Kock was fellow member of Institute of Electrical and Electronics Engineers, American Physical Society and Acoustical Society of America. He died on November 25, 1982, in Ann Arbor, Michigan and was survived by his wife and three children.

== Research ==
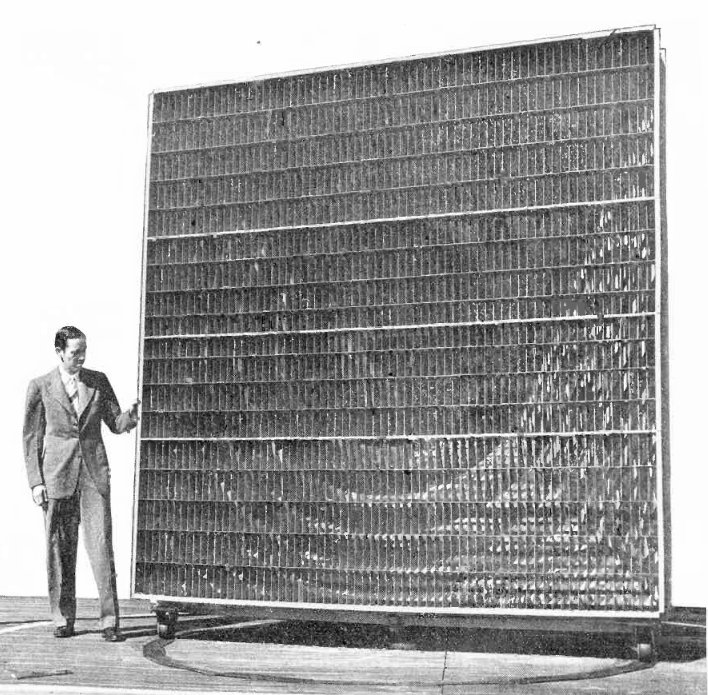
Kock standing next to his invention, a metallic lens antenna, in 1946

He continued work in electronic music engineering from the age of electronic tubes all the way to the invention of the transistor. He also researched holography, gamma rays, semiconductors, picture phone and artificial dielectrics. His work in artificial dielectrics preceded metamaterials by approximately 50 years.

== Patents ==
Kock received over 200 patents in the electrical engineering and acoustic engineering fields.

- In 1935 Kock applied for a patent describing formant circuits in an electronic organ.
- Electrical Organ W. E. KOCK et al., Patent number: 2233948; Filing date: Mar 17, 1938; Issue date: Mar 4, 1941
- Oscillation Generator: Patent number: 2400309; Filing date: Oct 31, 1941; Issue date: May 14, 1946
- Electrical musical instrument: Patent number: 2328282; Filing date: Apr 23, 1941; Issue date: Aug 31, 1943
- Metallic structure for delaying unpolarized waves: Patent number: 2577619; Filing date: May 16, 1947; Issue date: Dec 4, 1951.
- Two-way television over telephone Lines. Patent number: 2895005; Filing date: Sep 30, 1954; Issue date: Jul 14, 1959.

== Books ==
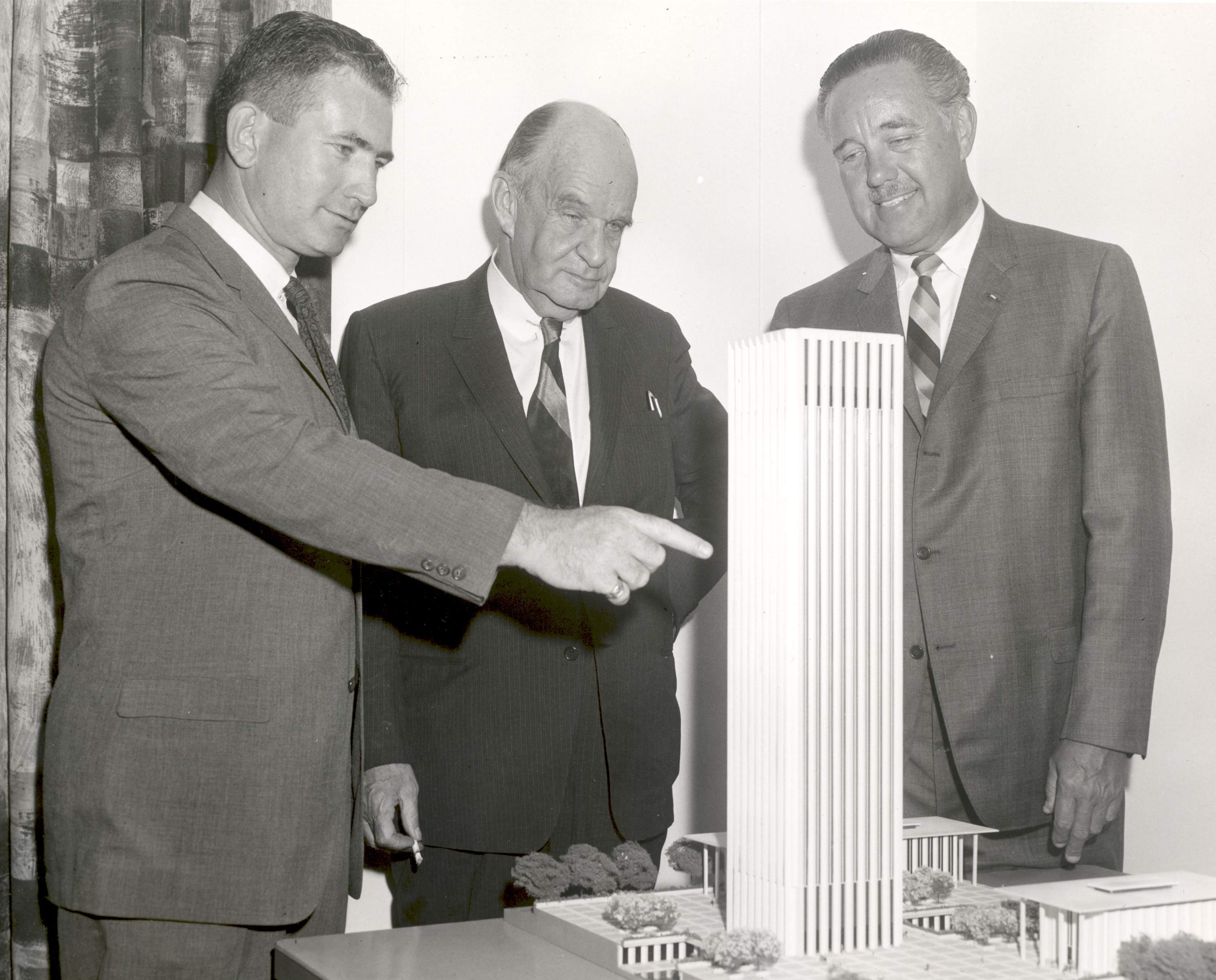
Examination of the model of Electronics Research Center's first phase of construction. From left to right: Albert J. Kelley, Edward Durell Stone, and Winston E. Kock

Kock wrote several books including Sound Waves and Light Waves (1965), Lasers and Holography (1981), Seeing Sound (1972), Radar, Sonar and Holography (1974), and The Creative Engineer: the art of inventing (1978).

He also authored Applications of Holography (Proceedings of United States-Japan Seminar on Information Processing by Holography, held in Washington, D.C., October 13–18, 1969).

== Published research ==
At the Fortieth Meeting of the Acoustical Society of America (November 9, 10, and 11, 1950) Kock, along with a colleague, contributed research results pertaining to "a photographic method using mechanical scanning for displaying the space patterns of sound and microwaves..." : Kock, W. E. (1951). "A Photographic Method for Displaying Sound Wave Space Patterns" (PDF). The Journal of the Acoustical Society of America. 23 (1): 149. Bibcode:1951ASAJ...23..149K. doi:10.1121/1.1917306.

Below is a list of some of Kock's published research:

- Kock, W.E. (1946). "Metal-Lens Antennas". Proceedings of the IRE. 34 (11): 828–836. doi:10.1109/JRPROC.1946.232264. S2CID 51658054.
- Cutler, C.C.; King, A.P.; Kock, W.E. (1947). "Microwave Antenna Measurements". Proceedings of the IRE. 35 (12): 1462–1471. doi:10.1109/JRPROC.1947.234571. S2CID 51664641.
- Kock, W.E. (1948). "Metallic Delay Lenses". Bell Syst. Tech. J. 27: 58–82. doi:10.1002/j.1538-7305.1948.tb01331.x.
- Kock, Winston (1959). "Related Experiments with Sound Waves and Electromagnetic Waves". Proceedings of the IRE. 47 (7): 1192–1201. doi:10.1109/JRPROC.1959.287350. S2CID 51646360.
- Kock, Winston (1962). "Speech Communication Systems". Proceedings of the IRE. 50 (5): 769–776. doi:10.1109/JRPROC.1962.288289. S2CID 51643153.
- Augustine, C.F.; Kock, W.E. (1969). "Microwave holograms using liquid crystal displays". Proceedings of the IEEE. 57 (3): 354–355. doi:10.1109/PROC.1969.6976.
- Kock, Winston E. (August 1, 1969). "Acoustics and Optics". Applied Optics. 8 (8): 1525–1531. Bibcode:1969ApOpt...8.1525K. doi:10.1364/AO.8.001525. PMID 20072471.

== See also ==
Past artificial material scientists

- Jagadish Chandra Bose
- Horace Lamb
- Leonid Mandelstam
- Walter Rotman
- Sergei Schelkunoff
- Arthur Schuster

Metamaterial scientists

- Andrea Alù
- Nader Engheta
- George V. Eleftheriades
- Ulf Leonhardt
- John Pendry
- Vladimir Shalaev
- David R. Smith
- Victor Veselago
- Richard W. Ziolkowski
