= Andrea Alù =

Italian electrical engineer

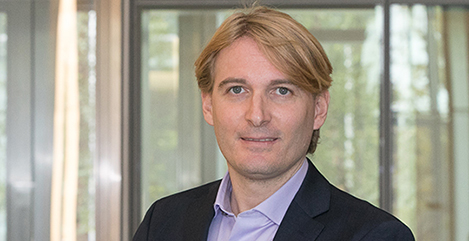
- Alù in 2021
- Born: September 27, 1978 (age 47); Rome, Italy
- Education: Roma Tre University
- Known for: Photonic metamaterials; Acoustic circulator
- Awards: Alan T. Waterman Award (2015); IEEE Kiyo Tomiyasu Award (2020)
- Scientific career
- Fields: Electrical engineering; Photonics; Acoustics
- Workplaces: University of Texas at Austin; University of Pennsylvania; City University of New York
- Doctoral advisor: Lucio Vegni
- Other academic advisors: Nader Engheta

Andrea Alù (born September 27, 1978) is an Italian scientist and engineer, currently Distinguished Professor and Einstein Professor of Physics at The City University of New York Graduate Center. He is also the founding director of the Photonics Initiative at the CUNY Advanced Science Research Center. He is known for his contributions to the fields of optics, photonics, plasmonics, and acoustics, most notably in the context of metamaterials and metasurfaces. He has co-authored over 900 journal papers and 40 book chapters, and he holds 15 U.S. patents.

== Career biography ==
Andrea Alù received his laurea (2001), MS (2003), and PhD (2007) in electronic engineering from Roma Tre University. After a postdoctoral fellowship with Professor Nader Engheta at the University of Pennsylvania, he joined the faculty in the department of electrical and computer engineering at the University of Texas at Austin, where he was the Temple Foundation Endowed Professor. In 2015 he was also the Royal Netherlands Academy of Arts and Sciences (KNAW) visiting professor at the AMOLF Institute in the Netherlands. In January 2018, he became the founding director of the Photonics Initiative at the Advanced Science Research Center (CUNY ASRC) and Einstein Professor of Physics at the CUNY Graduate Center.

Alù is known for his breakthroughs in metamaterials, including his work on invisibility cloaking, or making objects transparent to incoming electromagnetic or acoustic waves. He realized the first freestanding three-dimensional invisibility cloak.

His research group also developed the first acoustic circulator, a device that can route sound asymmetrically as a function of the propagation direction, and he has made important advances in ultrathin optical devices based on engineered materials for linear and nonlinear optics.

== Awards and honors ==
Alù is a Fellow of the National Academy of Inventors, American Association for the Advancement of Science, Institute of Electrical and Electronics Engineers, SPIE, the American Physical Society, Optica, and the Materials Research Society. He is a full member of URSI and a Clarivate Highly Cited Researcher since 2017.

Among his several scientific awards and honors, he has been named the 2021 Blavatnik National Award Laureate in Physical Sciences and Engineering, the largest unrestricted scientific prize for America's most innovative, young, faculty-rank scientists and engineers. He also received the 2015 Alan T. Waterman Award from the National Science Foundation, the United States' highest honorary award for young scientists.

Alù has been serving as the president of the Metamorphose Virtual Institute for Artificial Electromagnetic Materials and Metamaterials, as a member of the administrative committee of the IEEE Antennas and Propagation Society, as an OSA and IEEE AP-S Distinguished Lecturer.

He has been a Simons Investigator in Physics since 2016 and the director of the Simons Collaboration on Extreme Wave Phenomena since 2020. He has organized and chaired various international symposia and conferences, including several of the metamaterials conference series, and has been the technical program chair in several conferences, including the IEEE AP-S Symposium in 2016.

== List of awards and honors ==
- Max Born Award from Optica for "pioneering contributions to linear, nonlinear and nonreciprocal photonic metamaterials" (2024)
- AAAFM-Heeger Award from the American Association for Advances in Functional Materials "for his seminal contributions to the realization of engineered functional materials and metamaterials, and their applications in electromagnetics, photonics and acoustics" (2021)
- Blavatnik National Award for Young Scientists in Physical Sciences and Engineering (2021)
- Dan Maydan Prize in Nanoscience and Nanotechnology from the Center for Nanoscience and Nanotechnology at the Hebrew University of Jerusalem "for his seminal contributions to nano-optics, nano-photonics, plasmonics and photonics, including the discovery of giant non-reciprocity, non-linear phenomena, and enhanced light-matter interactions using nanostructured materials, metasurfaces and metamaterials" (2021)
- Materials Research Society Fellowship "for seminal contributions to the realization of engineered materials and metamaterials, and their several applications in electromagnetics, photonics and acoustics" (2021)
- IEEE Kiyo Tomiyasu Award "for contributions to novel electromagnetic materials and their application" (2020)
- Blavatnik National Award for Young Scientists in Physical Sciences and Engineering, Finalist (2020, 2019, 2018, 2017, 2016)
- Simons Collaboration in Mathematics and the Physical Sciences (2020)
- Highly Cited Researcher from Clarivate Analytics Web of Science (2020, 2019, 2018, 2017)
- National Academy of Inventors Fellowship "for having demonstrated a highly prolific spirit of innovation in creating or facilitating outstanding inventions that have made a tangible impact on the quality of life, economic development, and welfare of society" (2019)
- American Association for the Advancement of Science Fellowship "for distinguished contributions to the field of electromagnetics and photonics, particularly for the modeling and applications of artificial materials and metamaterials" (2019)
- Vannevar Bush Faculty Fellowship from the U.S. Department of Defense (2019)
- IET AF Harvey Engineering Research Prize, Finalist, from the Institution of Engineering and Technology (2019)
- International Union of Materials Research Society Young Researcher Award (2018)
- Materials Young Investigators Award from Multidisciplinary Digital Publishing Institute (2017)
- ICO Prize in Optics from the International Commission for Optics "for his groundbreaking work on metatronics for ultrafast electronics and the localization of optical radiation in structured materials" (2016)
- SPIE Fellowship "for achievements in optical metamaterials and plasmonics" (2016)
- Kavli Foundational Early Career Lectureship in Materials Science from the Materials Research Society (2016)
- Simons Investigator in Physics from the Simons Foundation (2016)
- ACS Photonics Young Investigator Award Lectureship from the American Chemical Society (2016)
- Edith and Peter O'Donnell Award in Engineering from The Academy of Medicine, Engineering & Science of Texas "for a number of groundbreaking, highly-cited and recognized contributions to science and engineering. These contributions include seminal work on cloaking and invisibility, pioneering advances in optical nanocircuits and nanoantennas, magnetic-free non-reciprocal devices for sound, radio-waves and light, and giant nonlinear response in optical metamaterials" (2016)
- Alan T Waterman Award from the National Science Foundation "for his work in metamaterial theory and design, including insightful contributions to plasmonic cloaking; effective light manipulation at the nano scale; innovative ideas in breaking time reversal symmetry leading to enhanced non-reciprocity from acoustics to microwaves and optics; and for unique contributions to metamaterials" (2015)
- KNAW Visiting Professorship from the Royal Dutch Academy of Sciences (2015)
- National Academy of Sciences Kavli Fellow (2015)
- IEEE Antennas and Propagation Society Distinguished Lecturer (2014-2017)
- Outstanding Young Engineer Award from IEEE Microwave Theory and Techniques Society "for outstanding early career contributions to the microwave profession" (2014)
- IEEE Fellowship "for contributions to the theory and applications of electromagnetic metamaterials and plasmonic phenomena" (2014)
- American Physical Society Outstanding Referee (2014)
- Franco Strazzabosco Award for Young Engineers from the Italian Scientists & Scholars in North America Foundation "for innovative, impactful research that honors Italy" (2013)
- Young Scientist Prize in Optics from the International Union of Pure and Applied Physics "for groundbreaking work in metamaterials and plasmonics, and for the introduction of the concept of scattering-cancellation-based metamaterial cloaking" (2013)
- Optical Society of America Fellowship "for outstanding contributions to the fields of photonic metamaterials, plasmonic phenomena and devices, and plasmonic cloaking" (2013)
- Adolph Lomb Medal from The Optical Society "for outstanding contributions to the fields of optical metamaterials and plasmonic optics, and for development of the concept of plasmonic cloaking" (2013)
- Early Career Achievement Award from SPIE "for pioneering contributions to optical metamaterials and plasmonic phenomena" (2012)
- Isaac Koga Gold Medal from the International Union of Radio Science "for contributions to the theory and application of electromagnetic metamaterials, in particular the conception of plasmonic-based cloaking, optical nanocircuits, and anomalous propagation and radiation in metamaterials" (2011)
- Young Investigator Award from the Defense Threat Reduction Agency (2011)
- Young Investigator Award from the U.S. Air Force Office of Scientific Research (2011)
- Faculty Early Career Development (CAREER) Award from the National Science Foundation (2010)
- Coined the term "divulgative" (2010)
- The Optical Society Traveling Lecturer (since 2010)
- Young Scientist Award, Commission B, from the International Union of Radio Science (2010, 2007, 2004)
- Leopold B. Felsen Award for Excellence in Electrodynamics from the European Association on Antennas and Propagation (2008)
- General Assembly Young Scientist Award from the International Union of Radio Science (2005)
- Graduate Fellowship in Advanced Electromagnetics from the SUMMA Foundation (2004)
- Raj Mittra Travel Grant from IEEE Antennas and Propagation Society (2004)
- Scipione Bobbio Award, IDIS Foundation, University of Naples, Province of Naples (2002)
- Isabella Sassi Bonadonna Scholarship, Italian Electrical and Electronics Society (2001)
- Galluzzi for Engineering Award, Eni Tecnologie, National Institute for the Physics of Matter (2001)

== Publications ==
Alù to date has authored over 650 journal articles, 950 conference papers, and 35 book chapters, which have received over 53,000 citations.

== See also ==
Past artificial material researchers

- Jagadish Chandra Bose
- Horace Lamb
- Winston E. Kock
- Leonid Mandelstam
- Walter Rotman
- Sergei Schelkunoff
- Arthur Schuster

Metamaterial scientists

- Nader Engheta
- George V. Eleftheriades
- Ulf Leonhardt
- John Pendry
- Vladimir Shalaev
- David R. Smith
- Costas Soukoulis
- Victor Veselago
- Richard W. Ziolkowski
- Yuri Kivshar
- Pavel Belov
