= Louis W. Roberts =

American microwave physicist (1913–1995)

Louis Wright Roberts
- Born: September 1, 1913; Jamestown, New York
- Died: November 3, 1995 (aged 82); Melrose, Massachusetts
- Education: Fisk University (BA); University of Michigan (MS); Massachusetts Institute of Technology (Ph.D.)
- Occupation: Microwave physicist
- Employer(s): NASA (1967–1970); United States Department of Transportation (1970–1989)

Louis Wright Roberts (September 1, 1913 – November 3, 1995) was an African American microwave physicist. In the 1960s, he was the chief of the Microwave Laboratory at NASA's Electronics Research Center. In the 1970s and 1980s he worked at the United States Department of Transportation's John A. Volpe National Transportation Systems Center, beginning in senior research positions and ultimately becoming the director of the center. His research focused on optics and microwave engineering.

== Early life and education ==
Louis Wright Roberts was born on September 1, 1913, in Jamestown, New York, to Dora Catherine Wright and Louis Lorenzo Roberts. Roberts earned his bachelor's degree from Fisk University in 1935 and his master's degree from the University of Michigan in 1937. He studied for a doctoral degree at the University of Michigan from 1939 to 1941, later completing his studies at the Massachusetts Institute of Technology (MIT) in 1946. Fisk University later awarded him an honorary doctorate in 1985.

== Career ==
Roberts was an instructor at St. Augustine's University in Raleigh, North Carolina, from 1937 to 1939. He returned to St. Augustine's from 1941 to 1942 as an associate professor of physics. He then taught physics as an associate professor at Howard University in Washington, D.C., from 1943 to 1944. While teaching, he researched optics and microwave electronics. Roberts ultimately earned 11 patents throughout his career, and published technical papers and journal articles about microwave theory.

In 1944, Roberts joined Sylvania Electric Products as a manager in the tube division, where he worked on research and development. He left Sylvania in 1950. In 1950 or 1951, Roberts briefly joined MIT as research staff. Also in 1950, Roberts formed his first company, Microwave Associates, Inc., which was eventually located in Burlington, Massachusetts, and known as M/A Com. He later founded three other Massachusetts-based microwave research companies: Bomac Labs in Beverly, Metcom in Salem, and Elcon Labs in Peabody.

In 1967, Roberts joined NASA to become chief of its Microwave Laboratory at the Electronics Research Center in Cambridge, Massachusetts. Roberts was among the highest ranking African-American space program staff at NASA while the Apollo program was underway. He told the Bay State Banner that he had chosen to join NASA for the research opportunities, and because of its research facilities, which were more sophisticated than the ones at his companies. The Microwave Lab focused on microwave technology as applied to communications systems, and research topics included microwave antennas and solid state circuits. Roberts stayed at NASA until 1970, at which point he joined the United States Department of Transportation to continue his microwave research at the John A. Volpe National Transportation Systems Center. He spent several years researching the application of microwave technology to air traffic control, before becoming the director of the Center in 1977. He retired in 1989.

Roberts belonged to the American Association for the Advancement of Science, the American Physical Society, the American Mathematical Society, the American Institute of Aeronautics and Astronautics, and the Society of Automotive Engineers. He was a fellow of the Institute of Electrical and Electronics Engineers (IEEE), and for a time belonged to IEEE's Education Committee. Roberts also was a member of Phi Beta Kappa.

== Personal life ==
Roberts lived in Wakefield, Massachusetts, with his wife. He had two sons. He died on November 3, 1995.
