= Tomiyasu =

Tomiyasu is a Japanese surname. Notable people with the surname include:

- Kiyo Tomiyasu (1919–2015), American engineer who established the IEEE Kiyo Tomiyasu Award
- Takehiro Tomiyasu (born 1998), Japanese football player
