= Yaron Silberberg =

Israeli physicist

- ירון זילברברג
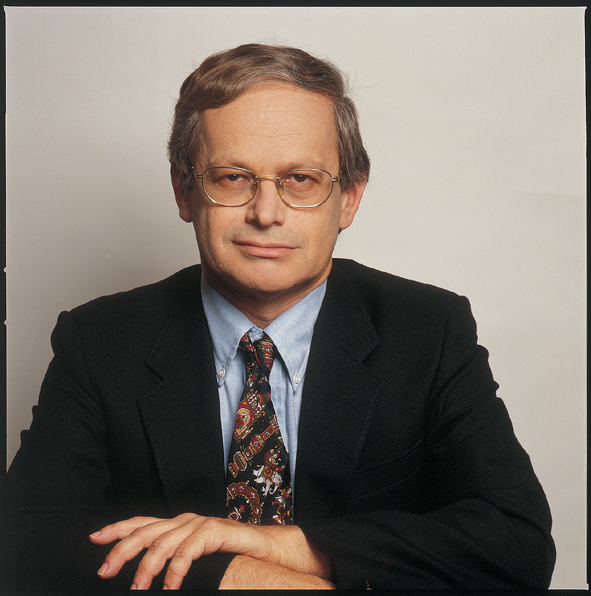
- Born: 1951
- Died: April 21, 2019 (aged 67–68)
- Education: Tel Aviv University; Weizmann Institute of Science
- Scientific career
- Workplaces: Weizmann Institute of Science; Bellcore

Yaron Silberberg (Hebrew: ירון זילברברג; 1951 – April 21, 2019) was an Israeli physicist at the Weizmann Institute of Science where he worked on nonlinear optics, integrated optics, optical solitons, and optical communication technology and physics with ultrashort laser pulses.

== Life ==
Silberberg studied physics at Tel Aviv University, earning a bachelor's degree in 1972 and at the Weizmann Institute, where he earned a master's degree in applied physics in 1975 and a doctorate in 1984. In between, he did research with the Israeli army from 1975 to 1979. From 1985 to 1994 he worked at Bellcore in Red Bank, New Jersey. At Bellcore he studied guided-wave optics, optical amplifiers, and soliton physics. In 1994 he became an associate professor at the Weizmann Institute and in 1999 was promoted to Professor in the Physics of Complex Systems Department. Silberberg headed this department from 1999 to 2002. From 2002 to 2008 he was Dean of Physics and from 2008 onward he headed the Crown Photonics Center at the Weizmann Institute.

Silberberg was a member of the Israeli Academy of Sciences. He became a fellow of Optica in 1991.

== Awards ==
- 2013 Max Born Award
- 2015 Weizmann Prize for Research in the Exact Sciences
- 2018 Rothschild Prize in Physical Sciences
