= Max Born Award =

Optical Society award

The Max Born Award is given by Optica (formerly the Optical Society of America) for outstanding contributions to physical optics and is named after Max Born, a physicist renowned for his foundational contributions to quantum mechanics and optics. The award was created to mark the centenary of Max Born's birth.

== Recipients ==
Source: The Optical Society

- 2026 Roberto Morandotti
- 2025 A. Douglas Stone
- 2024 Andrea Alu
- 2023 Marin Soljačić
- 2022 Yuri Kivshar
- 2021 Anne L'Huillier
- 2020 Nader Engheta
- 2019 Govind P. Agrawal
- 2018 Demetrios N. Christodoulides
- 2017 Miles J. Padgett
- 2016 Xiang Zhang
- 2015 John D. Joannopoulos
- 2014 Costas Soukoulis
- 2013 Yaron Silberberg
- 2012 Jean Dalibard
- 2011 Carlton M. Caves
- 2010 Vladimir M. Shalaev
- 2009 Mordechai Segev
- 2008 Peter W. Milonni
- 2007 Luigi Lugiato
- 2006 Richart Elliott Slusher
- 2005 Alexander E. Kaplan
- 2004 David E. Pritchard
- 2003 Howard Carmichael
- 2002 John L. Hall
- 2001 Bernard Yurke
- 2000 Jagdeep Shah
- 1999 Alain Aspect
- 1998 Peter Zoller
- 1997 Boris Zeldovich
- 1996 H. Jeffrey Kimble
- 1995 F. Tito Arecchi
- 1994 Valerian I. Tatarskii
- 1992 Rodney Loudon
- 1991 James P. Gordon
- 1990 Samuel L. McCall
- 1989 Dietrich Marcuse
- 1988 Girish Saran Agarwal
- 1987 Emil Wolf
- 1986 Herch Moysés Nussenzveig
- 1985 Roy J. Glauber
- 1984 Adolf W. Lohmann
- 1983 Joseph W. Goodman
- 1982 Leonard Mandel

== See also ==
- List of physics awards
