= Rotman lens =

Passive electronic component used for RF beamforming

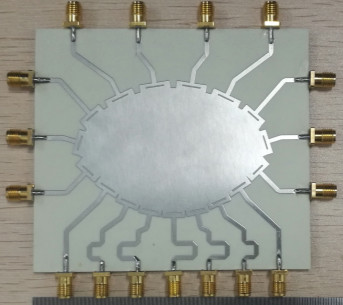
A microstrip implementation of a Rotman lens

A Rotman lens (sometimes referred to as a Rotman-Turner lens) is a passive electronic component used for beamforming in radio frequency applications. The principle was first published by Walter Rotman and R. F. Turner in 1963, and patented by Rotman the same year.

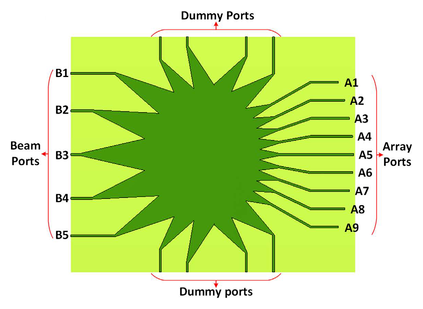
Beam, array and dummy ports on a Rotman lens

The component allows multiple antenna beams to be formed without the need for phase shifters. It consists of a range of input ports (also called beam ports) and output ports (also called array ports). A signal applied to one of the input ports arrives at each of the output ports with a different phase shift. If the output ports are connected to individual antennas in an antenna array, this allows shaping the beam in different directions by switching which input port the signal is sent to. So-called dummy ports can be added to the design, which are terminated to absorb fields that hit them, thus preventing reflections from the side wall of the lens.

Rotman lenses can be constructed either from hollow conductive waveguides or on a stripline or microstrip substrate. They are commonly used for beamforming in radar applications.
