= Shih-Fu Chang =

Taiwanese computer scientist and electrical engineer

- 張世富
- Born: Yunlin, Taiwan
- Education: National Taiwan University (BS); University of California, Berkeley (MS, PhD)
- Awards: National Academy of Engineering (2023); National Academy of Inventors (2022); Academician, Academia Sinica (2018); Fellow, ACM (Association for Computing Machinery) (2017); Fellow, IEEE (2004); IEEE Kiyo Tomiyasu Award (2009)
- Scientific career
- Fields: Computer science Electrical engineering
- Workplaces: Columbia University
- Thesis: Compositing and manipulation of video signals for multimedia network video services (1993)
- Doctoral advisor: David Messerschmitt
- Website: www.ee.columbia.edu/~sfchang

Shih-Fu Chang (Chinese: 張世富; pinyin: Zhāng Shìfù) is a Taiwanese computer scientist and electrical engineer who is the Morris A. and Alma Schapiro Professor of Engineering at Columbia University, where he has also served as the dean of the Fu Foundation School of Engineering and Applied Science since 2022.

Chang is noted for his research on multimedia information retrieval, computer vision, machine learning, and signal processing. He served as the chair of the Special Interest Group of Multimedia (SIGMM) at the Association for Computing Machinery (ACM) from 2013 to 2017. He was ranked as the Most Influential Scholar in the field of Multimedia by Aminer in 2016. He was elected as an ACM Fellow in 2017.

== Biography ==
Chang graduated from National Taiwan University with a Bachelor of Science (B.S.) in electrical engineering in 1985. He then earned a Master of Science (M.S.) in 1991 and his Ph.D. in 1993, both from the University of California, Berkeley, in electrical engineering and computer science.

After receiving his doctorate degree, he joined Columbia University as an assistant professor. He served as the Chair of Electrical Engineering from 2007 to 2010 and received joint appointment in Computer Science in 2011. He served as a co-PI and later as Co-Director of Columbia University’s ADVENT Industry Consortium, which includes more than 25 industry sponsors in the area of media technologies, from 1993 to 2003. He became the Senior Vice Dean (2012-2015) and later Senior Executive Vice Dean (2015-2022) of Columbia's Engineering School, assuming a major role in the School’s efforts in Strategic Planning, Special Research Initiatives, Faculty Development, and International Collaboration. He is currently the dean of Columbia School of Engineering and Applied Science. Chang is noted for his influential work in multimedia information retrieval, with broad applications in large-scale image/video search, mobile visual search, image authentication, and information retrieval with semi-supervised learning. His research has resulted in more than 10 technology licenses to companies and the creation of three startup companies. As of January 2023, his publications have been cited more than 67,000 times with an h-index of 130.

== Awards ==
Chang’s notable awards include:

- Member, National Academy of Engineering, 2023
- Member, National Academy of Inventors, 2022
- Academician, Academia Sinica 2018
- Fellow, ACM (Association for Computing Machinery), 2017
- Most Influential Scholar in the Field of Multimedia, 2016
- Honorary Doctorate, University of Amsterdam, 384th Anniversary, 2016
- Great Teacher Award, The Society of Columbia Graduates, 2013
- Technical Achievement Award, IEEE Signal Processing Society, 2012
- Technical Achievement Award, ACM Special Interest Group in Multimedia, 2011
- Fellow, the American Association for the Advancement of Science, 2010
- IEEE Kiyo Tomiyasu Award, 2009
- Fellow, the Institute of Electrical and Electronics Engineers, 2004, for contributions to digital video and multimedia technologies.

== Research ==
Chang’s research includes multimedia information retrieval, computer vision, machine learning, and signal processing. The primary focus of his work is on development of intelligent methods and systems for extracting information from visual content and multimedia that are prevalent in large archives and live sources. In the early 1990s, his group developed some of the earliest and best-known content-based image search systems, VisualSEEk and VideoQ, which set the foundation of this vibrant area. During last two decades, he has made significant contributions to the field of multimedia retrieval by developing large multimedia ontologies, large libraries of visual concept classifiers, and automatic methods for multimedia ontology construction. These have strongly influenced design of the video search systems used in practice today. He has developed several well-known compact hashing techniques for efficient search over billion-scale image databases. His compact hashing work has enabled order of magnitude speedup and storage reduction in high-profile applications such as an online human trafficking crime fighting system (joint work with Svebor Karaman) that has been deployed in 200+ law enforcement agencies. In addition, he has developed a series of fundamental methods of graph-based semi-supervised learning that successfully address the challenge of training large-scale multimedia retrieval systems with noisy and sparse labels. These methods have been adopted in building the first commercialized brain machine interface system for rapid image retrieval. The graph-based search process, based on the random walk with restart theory, developed jointly with X. Wu and Z. Li, has also been deployed in the large app recommendation system of Huawei (more than 300 million users).
