= Kaustav Banerjee =

American electrical engineer

Kaustav Banerjee is a professor of electrical and computer engineering and director of the Nanoelectronics Research Laboratory at the University of California, Santa Barbara. He obtained Ph.D. degree in electrical engineering and computer sciences from the University of California. He was named Fellow of the Institute of Electrical and Electronics Engineers (IEEE) in 2012 "for contributions to modeling and design of nanoscale integrated circuit interconnects." One of Banerjee's notable doctoral student is Deblina Sarkar, who later joined the faculty of Massachusetts Institute of Technology. The journal Nature Nanotechnology recognised their paper on tunnel field-effect transistor (TFET)-based biosensor published in Applied Physics Letters in as one of the highlight papers in 2012.

Banerjee is an elected fellow of the American Association for the Advancement of Science, American Physical Society, Institute of Electrical and Electronics Engineers, and Japan Society for the Promotion of Science. He has received the IEEE Kiyo Tomiyasu Award, Friedrich Wilhelm Bessel Research Award, and Humboldt Prize.
