= Rodney Loudon =

British physicist (1934–2022)

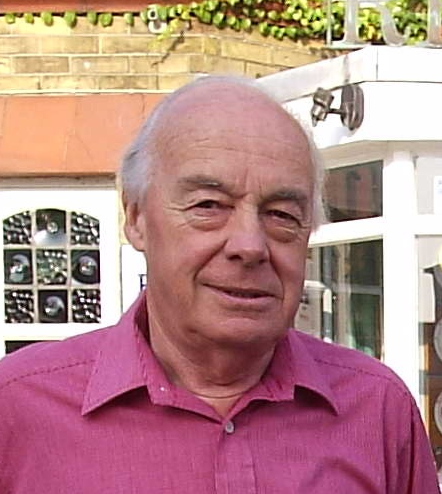
- Rodney Loudon 2004
- Born: 25 July 1934; Prestwich, Bury, Manchester, England
- Died: 25 December 2022 (aged 88); Hadleigh, Suffolk, England
- Education: University of Oxford (MA DPhil)
- Awards: FRS (1987); Young Medal and Prize (1987); Max Born Award (1992); Humboldt Prize (1998)
- Scientific career
- Fields: solid state physics; laser physics; light scattering
- Workplaces: University of California, Berkeley; RRE (1960-65); Bell Telephone Laboratories (1965-66); University of Essex (1966-2022)
- Thesis: The theory of the absorption edge in semiconductors
- Doctoral advisor: Roger J. Elliott

Rodney Loudon FRS (25 July 1934 – 25 December 2022) was a British physicist, best known for his work in quantum optics. He was Emeritus Professor of Theoretical Physics at the University of Essex. Loudon died on 25 December 2022, at the age of 88.

== Education ==
Loudon attended the Bury Grammar School in Manchester. He received his Master of Arts (1956) and Doctor of Philosophy (1959) degrees from the University of Oxford, where he was a member of the Brasenose College.After Oxford he undertook postdoctoral research at University of California, Berkeley

== Research work ==
Loudon's research focused on various aspects of theoretical solid state and laser physics, and particularly on light scattering. His 1964 paper on the Raman effect was one of the 100 most cited papers in all areas of physical science between 1960 and 1969. He has published more than 190 papers and 3 books, one of which (the three editions of The Quantum Theory of Light) is recognized internationally and has been translated into Russian and Japanese.

His early work on excitons, phonons and magnons and his later treatments of non-classical effects in the statistical properties of light have attracted many citations. His later work on surface excitations and on optical amplification, attenuation and detection has also proved to be important.

Loudon worked at the University of Essex as Professor, Chairman and Dean. He has also worked at British Telecom, Royal Radar Establishment, Bell Telephone Laboratories and Radio Corporation of America, and he has been a consultant to these organisations over several years, contributing to both applied and fundamental research. In addition to his physics research Loudon was a member of Institute of Physics Council and Opto-Electronics Group of Rank Prizes Committee.

== Books ==
- The Quantum Theory of Light (1973); 2nd edition (1983); 3rd edition (2000) ISBN 0-19-850177-3
- with William Hayes: Scattering of Light by Crystals (1978)
- with David J. Barber: An Introduction to the Properties of Condensed Matter (1989) ISBN 978-0521269070

== Awards and honours ==
- Loudon was elected a Fellow of the Royal Society (FRS) in 1987.
- Young Medal and Prize 1987
- Max Born Award 1992.
- Humboldt Prize 1998.
