= Georges A. Deschamps =

French American engineer (1911–1998)

Georges Armand Deschamps
- Born: October 18, 1911; Vendôme, France
- Died: June 20, 1998 (aged 86); United States
- Education: École normale supérieure University of Paris; Princeton University
- Scientific career
- Fields: Electrical engineering Applied electromagnetics
- Workplaces: Lycée Français de New York; ITT; University of Illinois at Urbana-Champaign
- Doctoral students: Richard W. Ziolkowski

Georges Armand Deschamps (October 18, 1911 — June 20, 1998) was a French American engineer and Professor Emeritus at the Department of Electrical Engineering at University of Illinois at Urbana-Champaign. He is best known for his contributions to electromagnetic theory, microwave engineering and antenna theory. He is also regarded as an early pioneer of microstrip and patch antennas, which he proposed in 1953.

== Biography ==
Born on October 18, 1911, in Vendôme, France, Deschamps was raised in Normandy. He was admitted to École normale supérieure in Paris in 1931, where he studied mathematics and was a classmate of Georges Pompidou, former President of France. He further received advanced degrees in physics and mathematics from University of Paris, Sorbonne. Initially planning to study topology with Eduard Čech at Masaryk University, he eventually went to Princeton University as a research associate for a year in 1937. Following this, he taught mathematics and physics at Lycée Français de New York. In the meantime, with the advent of World War II, he was enlisted to French Army and worked as an engineer for Maginot Line. Following the Battle of France in 1940, he escaped through North Africa and returned to the United States in 1941 to resume his teaching duties.

In 1947, Deschamps joined Federal Telecommunications Laboratories of ITT Inc. as a project engineer, where he worked on radio navigation and antenna design. In 1958, he joined University of Illinois at Urbana-Champaign as the director of the Antenna Laboratory, following the departure of the previous director, Victor H. Rumsey. The research work of the laboratory during this period focused on frequency independent antennas. In 1978, he was elected to the National Academy of Engineering for "his contributions to electromagnetic scattering, microwave engineering, and laser beam propagation." Being a Life Fellow of IEEE, he was a recipient of IEEE Centennial Medal (1984) and IEEE Antennas and Propagation Society Distinguished Achievement Award (1987). He retired from University of Illinois at Urbana-Champaign in 1982.

Deschamps died on June 20, 1998; he was survived by his wife Bunty, three children and five grandchildren.

== Research ==
Deschamps's research focused on electromagnetic theory and its applications in antenna and microwave engineering. In 1953, he proposed the concept of patch antenna concept at a United States Air Force Antenna Symposium; these antennas were eventually popularized and realized in the 1970s. His main research work at his tenure at University of Illinois at Urbana-Champaign included ray theory of electromagnetics, high-frequency asymptotics and complex point source representations of Gaussian beams, last of which he introduced. He also worked on the applications of differential forms to electromagnetics and focused primarily on the subject following his retirement.

== Selected publications ==
Journal articles

- Deschamps, G. A. (1951). "Geometrical representation of the polarization of a plane electromagnetic wave". Proceedings of the IRE. 39 (5): 540–544. doi:10.1109/JRPROC.1951.233136. S2CID 51662985.
- Deschamps, G. (1959). "Impedance properties of complementary multiterminal planar structures". IRE Transactions on Antennas and Propagation. 7 (5): 371–378. Bibcode:1959ITAP....7..371D. doi:10.1109/TAP.1959.1144717. hdl:2027/uiuo.ark:/13960/t79s33k0f.
- Deschamps, G. A. (1971). "Gaussian beam as a bundle of complex rays". Electronics Letters. 7 (23): 684–685. Bibcode:1971ElL.....7..684D. doi:10.1049/el:19710467.
- Deschamps, G. A. (1972). "Ray techniques in electromagnetics". Proceedings of the IEEE. 60 (9): 1022-1035. doi:10.1109/PROC.1972.8850.
- Deschamps, G.; Cabayan, H. (1972). "Antenna synthesis and solution of inverse problems by regularization methods". IEEE Transactions on Antennas and Propagation. 20 (3): 268–274. Bibcode:1972ITAP...20..268D. doi:10.1109/TAP.1972.1140197.
- Lee, Shung-Wu; Deschamps, G. (1976). "A uniform asymptotic theory of electromagnetic diffraction by a curved wedge". IEEE Transactions on Antennas and Propagation. 24 (1): 25–34. Bibcode:1976ITAP...24...25L. doi:10.1109/TAP.1976.1141283.
- Deschamps, G. A. (1981). "Electromagnetics and differential forms". Proceedings of the IEEE. 69 (6): 676-696. doi:10.1109/PROC.1981.12048. S2CID 24321634.
- Ziolkowski, Richard W.; Deschamps, Georges A. (1984). "Asymptotic evaluation of high-frequency fields near a caustic: An introduction to Maslov's method". Radio Science. 19 (4): 1001–1025. Bibcode:1984RaSc...19.1001Z. doi:10.1029/RS019i004p01001.
