= Gabriel M. Rebeiz =

Lebanese-American electrical and computer engineer

- Born: December 7, 1964 (age 61); Beirut, Lebanon
- Known for: Integrated phased arrays for communication and defense systems

Academic background
- Education: American University of Beirut; California Institute of Technology
- Thesis: Monolithic Millimeter-Wave Two-Dimensional Horn Imaging Arrays (1988)
- Doctoral advisor: David Rutledge

Academic work
- Institutions: University of California, San Diego; University of Michigan
- Doctoral students: George V. Eleftheriades

Gabriel M. Rebeiz is a Lebanese-American electrical engineer, who is currently the Wireless Communications Industry Chair Chair and Professor at University of California, San Diego. He is the first to introduce MEMS and micromachining to the RF/microwave field by developing several novel components with this technology. He is also the pioneer of the integrated phased arrays for communication and defense systems. He was elected a member of the National Academy of Engineering (NAE) in 2016 for contributions to radio frequency microelectromechanical systems (RF MEMS) and phased array technologies. He is also a Fellow of the Institute of Electrical and Electronics Engineers.
