= Boris Zeldovich =

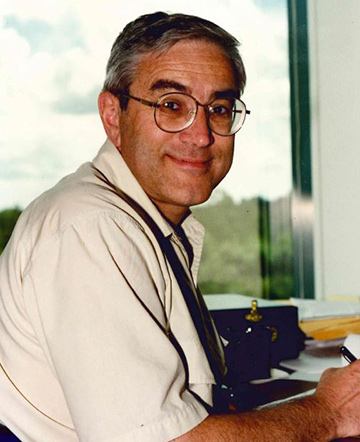
- Born: Boris Yakovlevich Zeldovich; 23 April 1944; Moscow, Soviet Union (present-day Russia)
- Died: 16 December 2018 (aged 74); United States
- Citizenship: Russia, United States
- Education: Moscow State University
- Awards: USSR State Award (1983); Max Born Award (1997)
- Scientific career
- Fields: Physics; Non-linear optics Optical waveguides
- Workplaces: P.N. Lebedev Physical Institute; Institute of Electrophysics of the Ural Branch of RAS; University of Central Florida College of Optics and Photonics

Boris Yakovlevich Zeldovich (Russian: Бори́с Я́ковлевич Зельдо́вич; 23 April 1944 – 16 December 2018) was a Russian-American physicist and a son of the famous Soviet physicist Yakov Borisovich Zeldovich. He was doctor of the Physical and Mathematical sciences (from 1981) and a corresponding member of the Russian Academy of Sciences. Since 1994 Zeldovich worked as a professor at the College of Optics and Photonics at the University of Central Florida. During his lifetime he received a number of prestigious awards, including the USSR State Prize in 1983 and the Max Born Award in Physical Optics from the Optical Society (OSA) in 1997 for his contributions to the fields of non-linear optics, optical waveguide theory and optical holography. B.Zeldovich predicted and discovered, experimentally, the giant optical nonlinearity of liquid crystals, which is 10^{10} times stronger than for usual media and is the co-discoverer of optical phase conjugation. He died on 16 December 2018 at the age of 74.
