= Deblina Sarkar =

Indian scientist and inventor

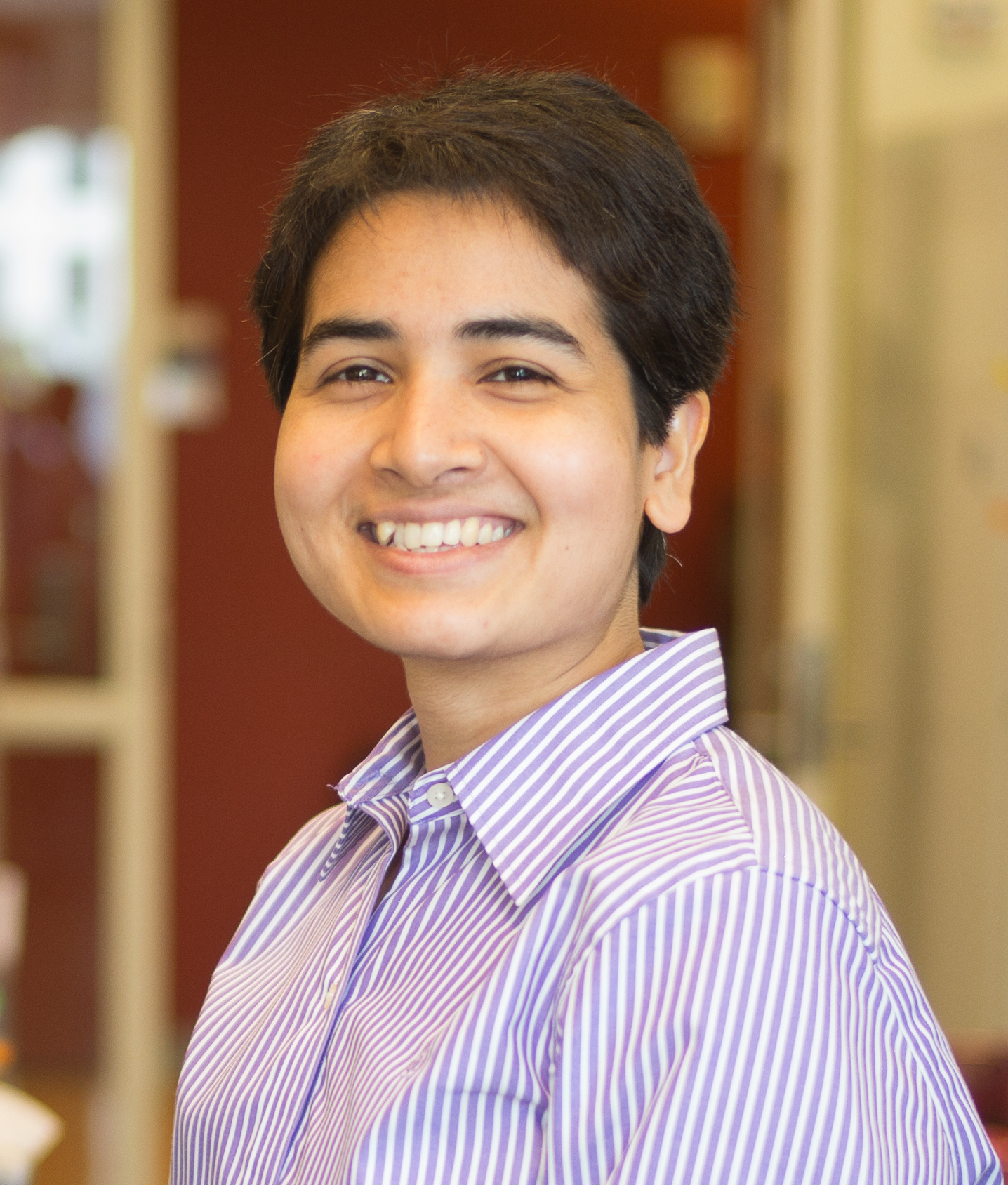
- Sarkar in 2018
- Born: Kolkata, West Bengal, India
- Education: IIT (ISM) Dhanbad; University of California, Santa Barbara
- Known for: Ultra thin quantum mechanical transistor (ATLAS-TFET), nanoscale biosensors, expansion microscopy
- Awards: 2018 MIT Technology Review's Top 10 Innovator Under 35 from India, 2016 CGS/ProQuest Distinguished Dissertation Award in Mathematics, Physical Sciences, and Engineering, 2016 UCSB Winifred and Louis Lancaster Dissertation Award for Math, Physical Science and Engineering, 2008 U.S. Presidential Fellowship
- Scientific career
- Fields: Nanoelectronics; Neuroscience
- Workplaces: MIT Media Lab
- Thesis: 2D Steep Transistor Technology: Overcoming Fundamental Barriers in Low-Power Electronics and Ultra-Sensitive Biosensors (2015)
- Doctoral advisor: Kaustav Banerjee

Deblina Sarkar is an Indian electrical engineer, and inventor, born in Kolkata, West Bengal. She is an assistant professor at the Massachusetts Institute of Technology (MIT) and the AT&T Career Development Chair Professor of the MIT Media Lab. Sarkar has been internationally recognized for her invention of an ultra thin quantum mechanical transistor that can be scaled to nano-sizes and used in nanoelectronic biosensors. As the principal investigator of the Nano Cybernetic Biotrek Lab at MIT, Sarkar leads a multidisciplinary team of researchers towards bridging the gap between nanotechnology and synthetic biology to build new nano-devices and life-machine interfacing technologies with which to probe and enhance biological function.

== Early life and academic career ==
Sarkar was born in Kolkata, West Bengal, India and pursued her undergraduate education in electrical engineering at the Indian Institute of Technology (Indian School of Mines), Dhanbad, India. During her undergraduate degree, she focused her research on nanoscale device design and spintronics, receiving international recognition for her work. The paper she published in 2007 explored the efficacy of double-gate MOSFETs. Before completing her degree, she spent a summer as an intern in Laurens Molenkamp's laboratory at the Wurzburg University, Germany, conducting research in spintronics. She graduated with her B.E. degree in 2008, and moved to the United States to pursue both a master's degree and a Ph.D. at the University of California at Santa Barbara (UCSB).

At UCSB, Sarkar trained in nanoelectronics under the mentorship of Kaustav Banerjee where she pioneered techniques to improve energy-efficiency in nano-devices and developed novel field effect transistor biosensors using molybdenum disulfide (MoS2). After completing her Ph.D. work in 2015, Sarkar began her postdoctoral fellowship at MIT in the Synthetic Neurobiology group. Under the mentorship of Edward Boyden, Sarkar developed novel technologies to map brain structure and function.

In 2020, Sarkar joined the faculty at MIT as an Assistant Professor and became the AT&T Career Development Chair Professor at MIT Media Labs. She became the principal investigator of a group of researchers which she has called the Nano-Cybernetic Biotrek Lab. Sarkar broke down the name of her group to explain why the name represents the scientific questions and adventure they engage in. The "nano" refers to the fact that the team builds nanoscale devices, cybernetic refers to using technology to control computing, biological, or hybrid systems, the bio represents the integration of biology, and "trek" represents the scientific adventure they have embarked on.

== Research and inventions ==
=== Atomically thin channel sub-thermal transistor ===
Sarkar invented a quantum-mechanical transistor, called the atomically thin and layered semiconducting-channel tunnel-FET (ATLAS-TFET). This device overcomes the fundamental thermal limitations in power of conventional transistors and achieves subthermionic subthreshold swing due to quantum mechanical tunneling based carrier transport. Efficient tunneling is achieved because of its unique heterostructure design consisting of doped germanium source, atomically thin MoS_{2} channel, and large tunnelling area. This transistor can help in addressing both dimensional and power scalability issues of Information Technology. Sarkar's efforts to build this quantum-mechanical transistor, was published in Nature. This work was highlighted by Nature News and Views as "Flat transistor defies the limit".

=== Ultra-sensitive electrical biosensors ===
Sarkar developed a novel Field-effect transistor based biosensor using MoS_{2} which provides high sensitivity, 74-fold higher than graphene, but also ease of patternability and device fabrication as it has a 2D atomically layered structure. Her development is compatible in biological tissues and provides a novel pathway to detect single molecules, highlighting the power of MoS_{2} materials in the next-generation of biosensors. Moreover, Sarkar showed that steep turn-ON characteristics, obtained through novel technology such as band-to-band tunneling, can result in unprecedented performance improvement compared to that of conventional electrical biosensors, with around 4 orders of magnitude higher sensitivity and ten-fold lower detection time. This can open up new avenues for wearable/implantable medical devices as well as point-of-care applications.

=== High-frequency model of graphene ===
Sarkar and team developed a detailed methodology for the accurate evaluation of DC to high-frequency impedance of 2D layered structures. This model provides insights into the physics of on-chip 2D interconnects and inductors and revealed for the first-time anomalous skin effect in graphene. Going beyond the simplifying assumptions of Ohm's law, this model takes into account the effects of electric-field variation within mean free path and current dependency on the nonlocal electric-field, to accurately capture the high-frequency behavior of graphene. It showed for the first time that the high-frequency resistance of intercalation doped multi-layer graphene interconnects is lower than that of copper and carbon nanotubes (CNTs). Moreover, as high as 32 and 50% improvements in quality-factor compared to copper and CNTs respectively, can be achieved with graphene-based inductors. This model is critical for building high frequency/RF devices in emerging technologies including "all 2D" integrated circuits, which can lead to flexible/conformable computers and prosthetic devices.

=== Nanoscale mapping of the brain ===
Sarkar and team, developed a novel tool called iterated direct expansion microscopy (idExM), which enables researchers optical access to nanoscale structures by expanding tissues. Cellular structures, such as synapses between neurons, are densely packed with molecules impeding access of antibodies and other labelling tools. Further, target molecules might be beyond the limits of diffraction such that light microscopes are unable to capture the fine detail and resolution of biological units. To enable visualization of nanoscale biological architectures as well as gain labeling access to even the most dense biological structures, Sarkar and her team developed idExM where they imbed tissue in hydrogel and use both mechanical and electrostatic forces to achieve nearly 100-fold linear expansion of tissues. This technology revealed nanoscale trans-synaptic architecture in brain tissue and intricate organization of amyloid-β plaques associated with Alzheimer's disease.

== Awards and honors ==
- Distinguished Scientist Award (one of 3 awardees nationwide) (2023)
- Early Career Distinguished Presenter at Materials Research Society (2023)
- Science News 10 Scientists to Watch (2023)
- Featured in Nature Neuroscience (2023)
- MIND Prize (Maximizing Innovation in Neuroscience Discovery) (2023)
- Abundance 360 Scholar (2022-2023)
- At&t Career Development Chair Professorship (2019-2023)
- Featured in Association for Women in Science (AWIS) News Brief (2022)
- NIH Directors New Innovator Award (2022)
- Perfect and Rarely Achieved Impact Score of 10 from NIH (2022)
- "Explorer of the Nano Age" feature by MIT.nano which highlighted eight pioneering nanotechnology researchers at MIT working to make the world a better place
- Innovative Early Career Engineer by National Academy of Engineering (2022)
- IEEE Nanotechnology Early Career Award (only awardee worldwide) (2022)
- Leading next generation scientist by United for Medical Research (2021)
- iCANX Young Scientist Award (2021)
- IEEE Electron Devices Society (EDS) feature (2021)
- Featured by Imagination in Action: series highlighting some of the world's most compelling people (2021)
- Featured in Neuron (2020)
- Young Scientist Excellence Award at Microsystems and Nanoengineering (Nature) (2020)
- Distinguished Alumnus Award as a "Young Achiever" from IIT (2020)
- Technology Review's Innovators Under Age 35 (one of 10 from India) (2018)
- NIH K99/R00 Pathway to Independence Award (2018)
- MIT Translational Fellow (2017)
- One of the top 3 dissertations throughout USA and Canada in the field of Mathematics, Physical sciences and all departments of Engineering (2016)
- Lancaster Award for the best PhD Dissertation in the field of Mathematics, Physical Sciences and all departments of Engineering at UCSB in the period 2014-2016 (2016)
- One of the 4 young scientists worldwide to present a master class on physics in structural biology and medical diagnostics Lindau Nobel Laureate Meeting (2016)
- MRS Graduate Student Award (2015)
- Rising Star in Electrical Engineering and Computer Science (2015)
- Falling Walls Lab Young Innovator Award at UCSD (One of the 3 winners) (2015)
- "Bright Mind" honor at KAUST-NSF Conference (one of 4 honorees from USA) (2015)
- Dissertation Fellowship, UCSB (2014)
- IEEE EDS PhD Fellowship Award (only one from the Americas and one of the 3 students worldwide to win it) (2011)
- US Presidential Fellowship for pursuing graduate research (2008)
- Outstanding Doctoral Candidate Fellowship (2008)

== Selected publications ==
- Iterative Direct Expansion Microscopy. D. Sarkar, A. Wassie, J. Kang, T. Tarr, A. Tang, T. A. Blanpied, E. S. Boyden. Society for Neuroscience, 2019
- 2D materials for FET based biosensors. D. Sarkar. Fundamentals and Sensing applications of 2D materials, Ed: C.S. Rout, D.J. Late and Hywel Morgan, Woodhead Publishing Series, Elsevier, 2019
- Glyoxal as an alternative to PFA in immunostaining and nanoscopy. K. N. Richter, N. H. Revelo, K. J. Seitz, M. S. Helm, D. Sarkar et al.. The EMBO Journal, 2017.
- Multiplexed neural recording along a single optical fiber via optical reflectometry. S. G. Rodriques, A. H. Marblestone, J. Scholvin, J. Dapello, D. Sarkar, M. Mankin, R. Gao, L. Wood and E. S. Boyden. Journal of Biomedical Optics, Vol. 21, No. 5, pp. 057003, 2016.
- A Subthermionic Tunnel Field-Effect Transistor with an Atomically Thin Channel. Deblina Sarkar, Xuejun Xie, Wei Liu, Wei Cao, Jiahao Kang, Yongji Gong, Stephan Kraemer, Pulickel M. Ajayan and Kaustav Banerjee. Nature (journal), Vol. 526, pp. 91–95, 2015
- Functionalization of Transition Metal Dichalcogenides with Metallic Nanoparticles: Implications for Doping and Gas-Sensing. Deblina Sarkar, Xuejun Xie, Jiahao Kang, Haojun Zhang, Wei Liu, Jose Navarrete, Martin Moskovits and Kaustav Banerjee. Nano Letters, Vol. 15, No. 5, pp. 2852–2862, 2015.
- MoS2 Field-Effect Transistor for Next-Generation Label-Free Biosensors. Deblina Sarkar, Wei Liu, Xuejun Xie, Aaron Anselmo, Samir Mitragotri and Kaustav Banerjee. ACS Nano, Vol. 8, No. 4, pp. 3992–4003, 2014.
- Impact-Ionization Field-Effect-Transistor Based Biosensors for Ultra-Sensitive Detection of Biomolecules. Deblina Sarkar, Harald Gossner, Walter Hansch and Kaustav Banerjee. Applied Physics Letters, Vol. 102, No. 20, 203110, 2013.
- Proposal for Tunnel-Field-Effect-Transistor as Ultra-Sensitive and Label-Free Biosensors. Deblina Sarkar and Kaustav Banerjee. Applied Physics Letters, 100, No. 14, 143108, 2012.
- Metallic-Nanoparticle Assisted Enhanced Band-to-Band Tunneling Current. Deblina Sarkar and Kaustav Banerjee. Applied Physics Letters, Vol. 99, No. 13, pp. 133116, Sept 26, 2011.
- High-Frequency Behavior of Graphene-Based Interconnects—Part I: Impedance Modeling. Deblina Sarkar, Chuan Xu, Hong Li, and Kaustav Banerjee. IEEE Transactions on Electron Devices, Vol. 58, No. 3, pp. 843–852, March 2011.
- A Novel Enhanced Electric-Field Impact-Ionization MOS Transistor. Deblina Sarkar, Navab Singh and Kaustav Banerjee. IEEE Electron Device Letters, Vol. 31, No. 11, pp. 1175–1177, Nov. 2010.
