= Alexander E. Kaplan =

American physicist (1938–2019)

Alexander E. Kaplan (born 9 June 1938 in Kyiv; died 31 December 2019) was a Soviet-American physicist who was known for his work on nonlinear optics and quantum electronics.

== Education ==
Kaplan studied physics at the Moscow Institute of Physics and Technology and earned his master's degree in 1961. He received his doctorate (in physics and mathematics) from the Russian Academy of Sciences and Gorky State University in 1967.

== Career ==
From 1961 to 1963 he conducted research at a state laboratory near Moscow, and from 1963 to 1979 Kaplan worked at the Soviet Academy of Sciences. From 1979 to 1982 he worked at the Francis Bitter Magnetic Laboratory at the Massachusetts Institute of Technology. Kaplan next worked as a professor of electrical engineering at Purdue University from 1982 to 1987. Finally, from 1987 until his retirement in 2016, he was a professor at Johns Hopkins University in the Department of Electrical and Computer Engineering.

In addition to his other positions, Kaplan was a visiting researcher at the Max Planck Institute for Quantum Optics in Garching in 1981. He also served as a visiting professor at the Weizmann Institute of Science, the University of Ulm, and Kyoto University.

Kaplan was a theorist who made contributions to various areas of nonlinear optics and quantum electronics. His major contributions were in the fields of very-high order sub-harmonics generation, nonlinear interfaces, soliton physics, relativistic nonlinear optics, and others.

== Recognition ==
In 1996 he received the Humboldt Prize from the Alexander von Humboldt Foundation. Kaplan was named a fellow of the Optical Society of America in 1987 and won their Max Born Award in 2005.
