= Karl F. Lindman =

Finnish physicist (1874–1952)

Karl Ferdinand Lindman
- Born: 7 June 1874; Ekenäs, Grand Duchy of Finland
- Died: 14 February 1952 (aged 77); Turku, Finland
- Education: University of Helsinki
- Known for: Optical rotation; Chiral media
- Scientific career
- Fields: Physics
- Workplaces: Åbo Akademi University; Svenska normallyceum i Helsingfors

Karl Ferdinand Lindman (7 June 1874 – 14 February 1952) was a Finnish physicist and educator. Best known for his work on chiral media, he has performed the experimental demonstration of optical rotation of microwaves in an artificial chiral medium in 1914. For the most of his career, he was a professor of physics at Åbo Akademi University.

== Biography ==
Karl Ferdinand Lindman was born on 7 June 1874 in Ekenäs, Grand Duchy of Finland to Karl Gustav and Lovisa Lindman. His father was a farmer with clerical duties. Receiving a degree of physics in 1895, Lindman obtained his PhD degree from University of Helsinki in 1901. He briefly resided in Leipzig from 1899 to 1901; his thesis work was partially done in Leipzig University.

Following his doctoral stufies, Lindman served as a secondary school teacher and authored textbooks in physics, chemistry and astronomy in Swedish and Finnish. He was a lecturer at Svenska normallyceum i Helsingfors, where he introduced laboratory courses. In 1907, he took sabbatical in England and Scotland to study teaching methods. Becoming a faculty member at Åbo Akademi University in 1918, he was appointed as the chair in physics in 1921, and served as the vice rector from 1921 to 1929. He also served as the dean of the Faculty of Mathematics and Natural Sciences during his tenure. Despite retiring in 1942, he carried a full teaching load until 1945.

Lindman was married to Hilma Lovisa Tallqvist. He died on 14 February 1952 and was survived by his son, Sven Lindman, who was a professor of political science in Åbo Akademi. A conference in honor of Lindman was organized in 1991 at Abo Akademi by Finnish chapters of URSI and IEEE. Electromagnetic Waves in Chiral and Bi-isotropic Media, a 1994 monograph on chiral and bi-isotropic media by Ismo Lindell and his colleagues, is dedicated to his honour.

== Research and contributions to chiral media ==
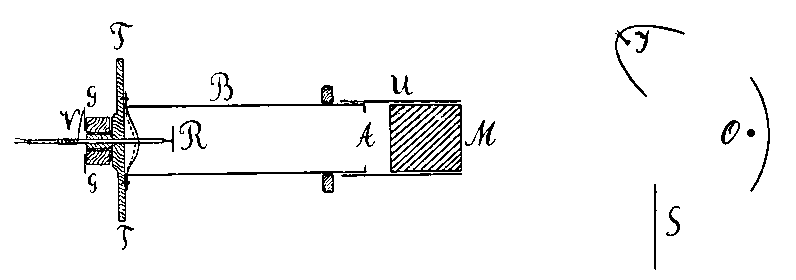
The apparatus used by Lindman in his 1914 experiment on artificial chirality. The box labeled with "M" houses the medium with helical inclusions.

Lindman was mainly an experimental physicist and his research work focused on electromagnetics: he is best known for his work on chiral media. In 1914, he has demonstrated the optical rotation in an artificial chiral medium experimentally. He has constructed the artificial medium from left- and right-handed copper helices that are suspended in cotton; he has observed that this composite material rotates the linearly polarized microwave signal in a circular waveguide apparatus. He has also shown that same number of left- and right-handed helices does not cause any polarization rotation. His observations were first reported in the same year in the proceedings of Finnish Society of Sciences and Letters; these were subsequently published in 1920 and 1922 in the German-language journal Annalen der Physik. Even though this experiment came after the Jagadish Chandra Bose's 1898 study on optical rotation of microwaves, it has acted as a progenitor to artificial dielectrics and metamaterials. The experiment was repeated in 1950s with more advanced apparatus and was subsequently adapted to terahertz waves in 2009. Following his publications from 1914 to early 1920s, Lindman continued his experiments in chirality and proposed different configurations to induce optical activity.

Lindman was also active in other areas of electromagnetics. His doctoral studies in University of Leipzig focused on the resonances and standing waves in a dipole antenna. In addition to resonances of wire antennas, Lindman has studied millimeter and infrared wave propagation, diffraction grids, scattering and waveguides. In 1940s, he studied the wave propagation in circular waveguides and parallel plates: these studies coincided with the flurry of interest in microwave propagation of waveguides for radar applications, stemming from the World War II.

Even though he did not publish any original research regarding the theory of relativity, he was critical of it and expressed his criticisms in his textbooks.

== Selected publications ==
- Lindman, Karl F. (1902). "Ueber stationäre elektrische Wellen". Annalen der Physik (in German). 312 (4): 824–850. Bibcode:1902AnP...312..824L. doi:10.1002/andp.19023120409.
- Lindman, Karl F. (1914). "Om en genom ett isotropt system av spiralformiga resonatorer alstrad rotationspolarisation av de elektromagnetiska vågorna" (PDF). Öfversigt af Finska Vetenskaps-Societetens Förhandlingar (in Swedish). 57 (3).
- Lindman, Karl F. (1920). "Zur Frage nach der Existenz wahrer Pyroelektrizität". Annalen der Physik (in German). 367 (10): 107–112. Bibcode:1920AnP...367..107L. doi:10.1002/andp.19203671003.
- Lindman, Karl F. (1920). "Über eine durch ein isotropes System von spiralförmigen Resonatoren erzeugte Rotationspolarisation der elektromagnetischen Wellen". Annalen der Physik (in German). 368 (23): 621–644. Bibcode:1920AnP...368..621L. doi:10.1002/andp.19203682303.
- Lindman, Karl F. (1922). "Über die durch ein aktives Raumgitter erzeugte Rotationspolarisation der elektromagnetischen Wellen". Annalen der Physik (in German). 374 (20): 270–284. Bibcode:1922AnP...374..270L. doi:10.1002/andp.19223742004.
