= Acoustic circulator =

Acoustic non-reciprocal three-port device

Symbol for a 3-port circulator

In acoustical engineering, an acoustic circulator is a non-reciprocal three-port device that couples airborne sound waves only to an adjacent port in the direction of circulation.

Compared to radio frequency (RF) and microwave circulators, acoustic circulators are for airborne sound waves rather than for RF and microwave electromagnetic signals.

In 2014, Fleury et al. reported and experimentally demonstrated an acoustic Y-circulator by exploiting the acoustic analogue of the Zeeman effect: the structure is composed of a ring cavity with a circulating fluid that facilitates the nonreciprocal transmission of sound waves between acoustic waveguides. Similar circulator designs based on temporal modulation of the effective acoustic index and natural convection were later reported.
