= IEEE Kiyo Tomiyasu Award =

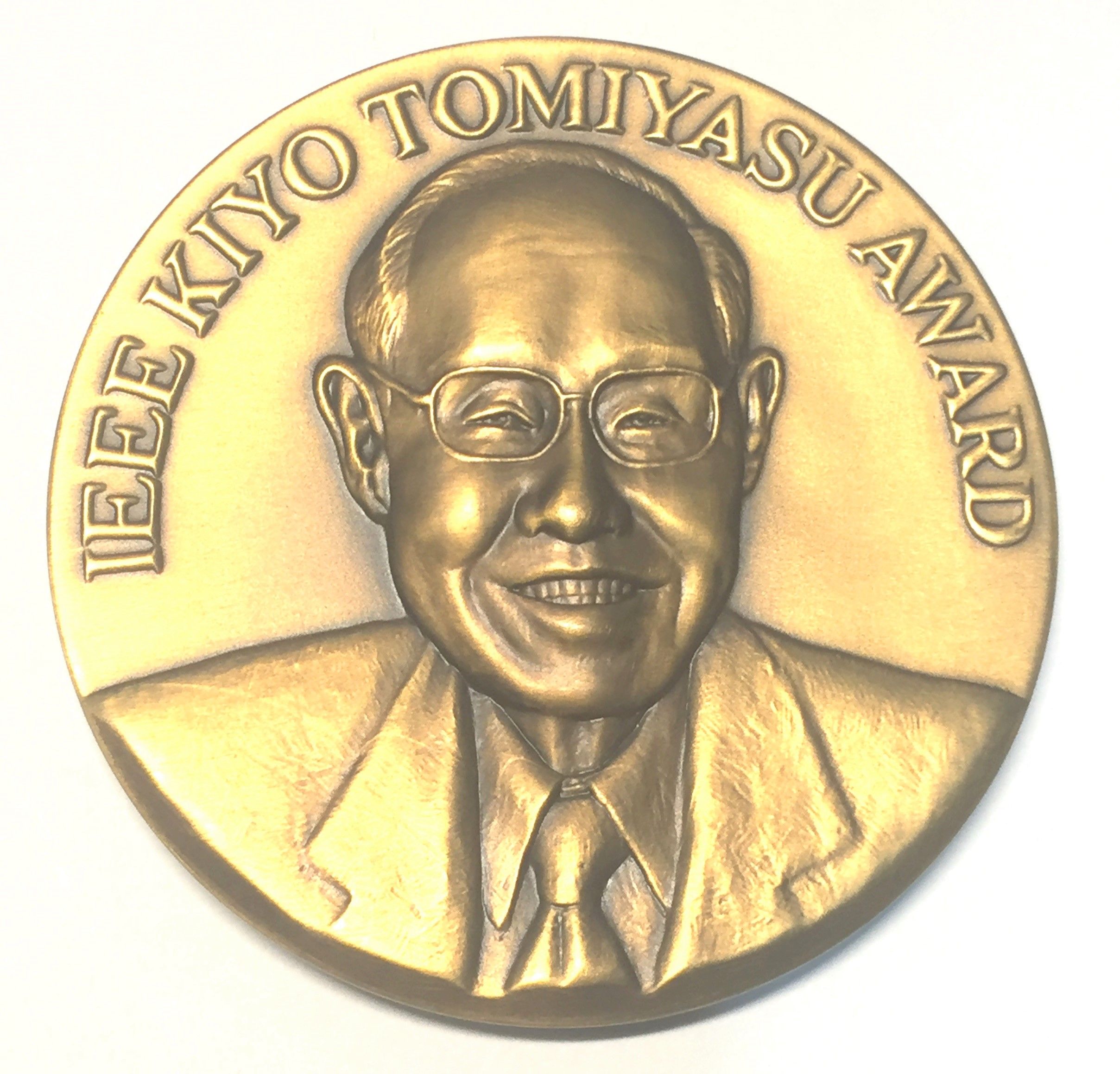
- Awarded for: Outstanding early to mid-career contributions to technologies holding the promise of innovative applications
- Country: USA
- Presented by: Institute of Electrical and Electronics Engineers
- First award: 2001
- Website: IEEE Kiyo Tomiyasu Award

The IEEE Kiyo Tomiyasu Award is a Technical Field Award established by the IEEE Board of Directors in 2001. It is an institute level award, not a society level award. It is presented for outstanding early to mid-career contributions to technologies holding the promise of innovative applications. The prize is sponsored by Dr. Kiyo Tomiyasu, the IEEE Geoscience and Remote Sensing Society, and the IEEE Microwave Theory and Techniques Society (MTT).

This award may be presented to an individual, multiple recipients or team of up to three people. Candidates must have graduated within the last fifteen years and must be no more than forty-five years old when nominated. Recipients of this award receive a bronze medal, certificate, and honorarium.

== Recipients & citations ==
- 2023: Tim Böscke

- For contributions to the discovery of ferroelectricity in hafnium-based oxides

- 2022: Pieter Abbeel

- for contributions to deep learning

- 2021: Zhu Han

- for contributions to game theory and distributed management of autonomous communication networks

- 2020: Andrea Alù

- for contributions to novel electromagnetic materials and their application.

- 2019: Robert W. Heath Jr. and Jeffrey Andrews

- for contributions to wireless communication systems

- 2018: Nicholas Laneman

- for cooperative communications and relaying techniques in wireless communications

- 2017: Emilio Frazzoli

- for developing planning and control algorithms of autonomous vehicles

- 2016: Yonina Eldar

- "for development of theory and implementation of sub-Nyquist sampling with applications to radar, communications, and ultrasound."

- 2015: Kaustav Banerjee and Vivek Subramanian

- "for contributions to nano-materials, devices, circuits, and CAD, enabling lowpower and low-cost electronics."

- 2014: George Chrisikos

- "for contributions to heterogeneous network architectures with ubiquitous wireless access."

- 2013: Carlos A. Coello Coello

-"for pioneering contributions to single- and multiobjective optimization techniques using bioinspired metaheuristics."

- 2012: Mung Chiang

- "for demonstrating the practicability of a new theoretical foundation for the analysis and design of communication networks."

- 2011: Moe Z. Win

- "for fundamental contributions to high speed reliable communications using optical and wireless channels"

- 2010: Tsu-Jae King

- "for contributions to nanoscale MOS transistors, memory devices, and MEMs devices."

- 2009: Shih-Fu Chang

- "for contributions to Automated Image Classification"

- 2008: George V. Eleftheriades

- "for pioneering contributions to the science and the technological applications of negative-refraction electromagnetic materials"

- 2007: Alberto Moreira

- "for development of synthetic aperture radar concepts."

- 2006: Muhammad A. Alam

- "for contributions to device technology for communication systems"

- 2005: Chai K. Toh

- "for pioneering contributions to communication protocols for ad hoc mobile wireless networks"

- 2004: David B. Fogel

- ""For outstanding contributions to the science and technology of computational intelligence and to the development and expansion of that field"

- 2003: Keshab K. Parhi

- "For pioneering contributions to high-speed and low-power digital signal processing architectures for broadband communications systems"

- 2002: Casimer DeCusatis

- "for contributions to optical technologies and fiber optic communications, holding the promise of innovative applications for computer networks.'
