= Albert J. Kelley =

American guidance systems engineer

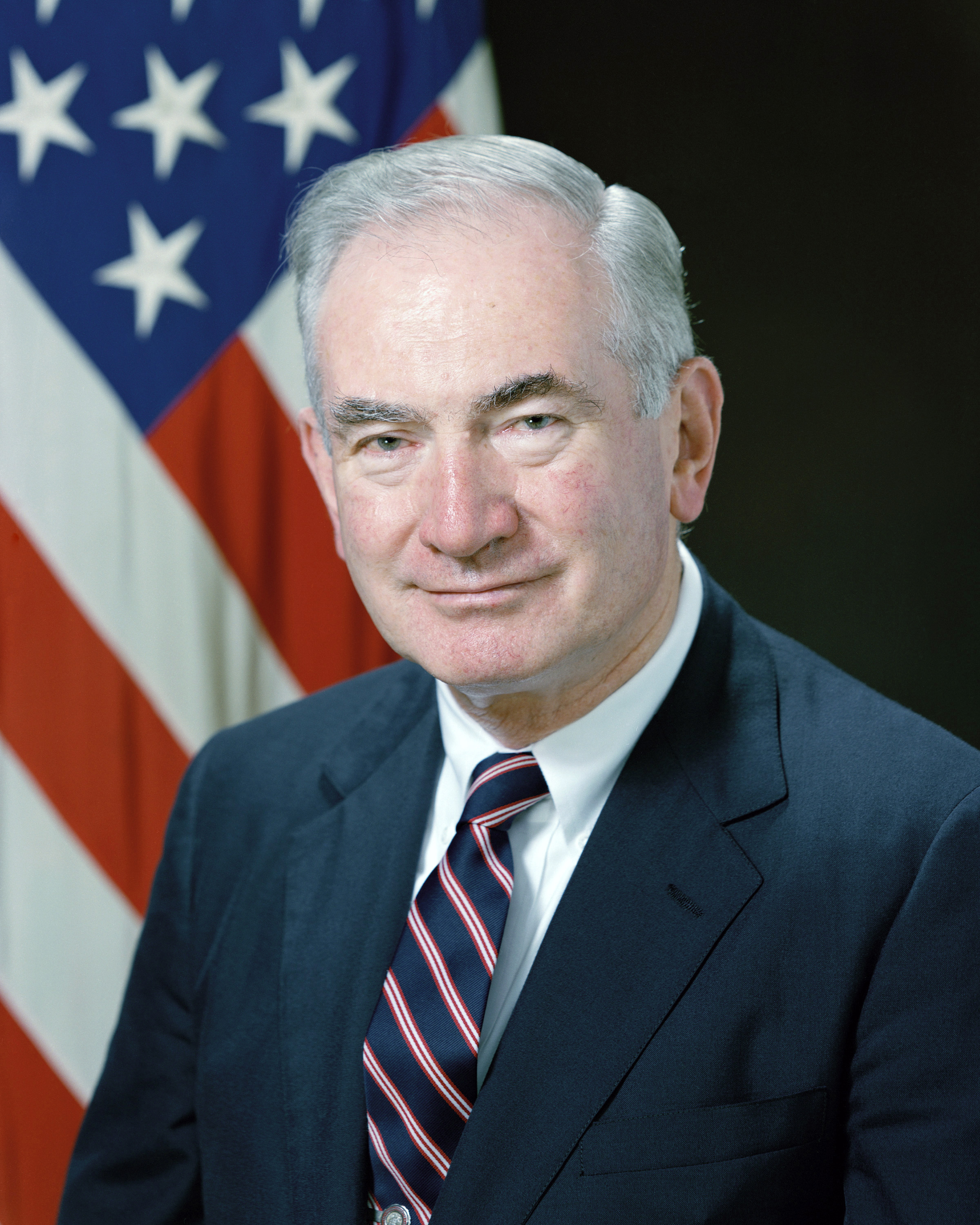

Deputy Under Secretary of Defense for International Programs
- In office 1990–1993
- Preceded by: Robert C. McCormack

Personal details
- Born: 27 July 1924 West Roxbury, Massachusetts, US
- Died: 8 December 2004 (aged 80) Arlington County, Virginia, US
- Education: U.S. Naval Academy (BS); Massachusetts Institute of Technology (ScD)

Military service
- Allegiance: United States
- Branch/service: United States Navy
- Years of service: 1945–1965
- Rank: Commander
- Battles/wars: Korean War
- Awards: Air Medal

Albert Joseph Kelley Jr. (27 July 1924 – 8 December 2004) was a United States Navy officer and guidance systems engineer who worked at NASA from 1960 to 1967, supervising electronics research for the Apollo program. He later served as the Deputy Under Secretary of Defense for International Programs from 1990 to 1993.

== Early life and education ==
Born in the West Roxbury neighborhood of Boston, Kelley graduated from Boston Latin School in 1942. Appointed to the Class of 1946 at the United States Naval Academy, he played running back on offense and linebacker on defense for the football team. Kelley completed his B.S. degree in 1945 and became a naval aviator. He studied electronics engineering at the Massachusetts Institute of Technology from 1947 to 1948 and later returned to earn a Doctor of Science degree in aeronautical engineering in 1956. His doctoral thesis was entitled Tactical and weapons system requirements for manned supersonic fighter-interceptor aircraft and his thesis advisor was Walter Wrigley, who later served as a doctoral advisor for astronauts Edwin "Buzz" Aldrin and Edgar Mitchell.

== Career ==
Kelley flew carrier-based aircraft from 1945 to 1947 during the military occupation of Japan and again during the Korean War, earning the Air Medal. Between these deployments, he was assigned to the aviation test center at Naval Air Station Patuxent River. After his Korean War combat experience, Kelley transferred from naval aviation to aeronautical engineering. Upon completing his doctorate, he was assigned to the Navy Bureau of Weapons where he worked on the design of high-performance aircraft and missile systems. Kelley was promoted to lieutenant commander effective 1 April 1957.

In 1960, Kelley was assigned to active detached duty with NASA. He became director of electronics and control at the NASA Office of Advanced Research and Technology and then served as deputy director of the NASA Electronics Research Center in Cambridge, Massachusetts from 1964 to 1967. He was promoted to commander effective 1 July 1961. Kelley retired from the Navy in 1965.

From 1967 to 1977, Kelley served as Dean of the Boston College School of Management. From 1977 to 1988, he served as senior vice president for management at Arthur D. Little Inc. From 1988 to 1990, Kelley was a senior vice president at the United Technologies Corporation.

During the George H. W. Bush administration, Kelley served as a Deputy Under Secretary of Defense from 1990 to 1993.

== Awards ==
Kelley was elected to the Boston Latin School Athletics Hall of Fame. He later received the NASA Exceptional Service Medal. Kelley was a Fellow of the Institute of Electrical and Electronics Engineers.

== Personal ==
Kelley had two sisters and a younger brother, General Paul X. Kelley, who served as commandant of the United States Marine Corps.

Kelley was married to Virginia M. Riley. They had three sons.

After having lived in Reston, Virginia, Kelley died from pneumonia in Arlington, Virginia.
