= Electronics Research Center =

Former NASA research facility

Coordinates: 42°21′50.67″N 71°5′8.16″W

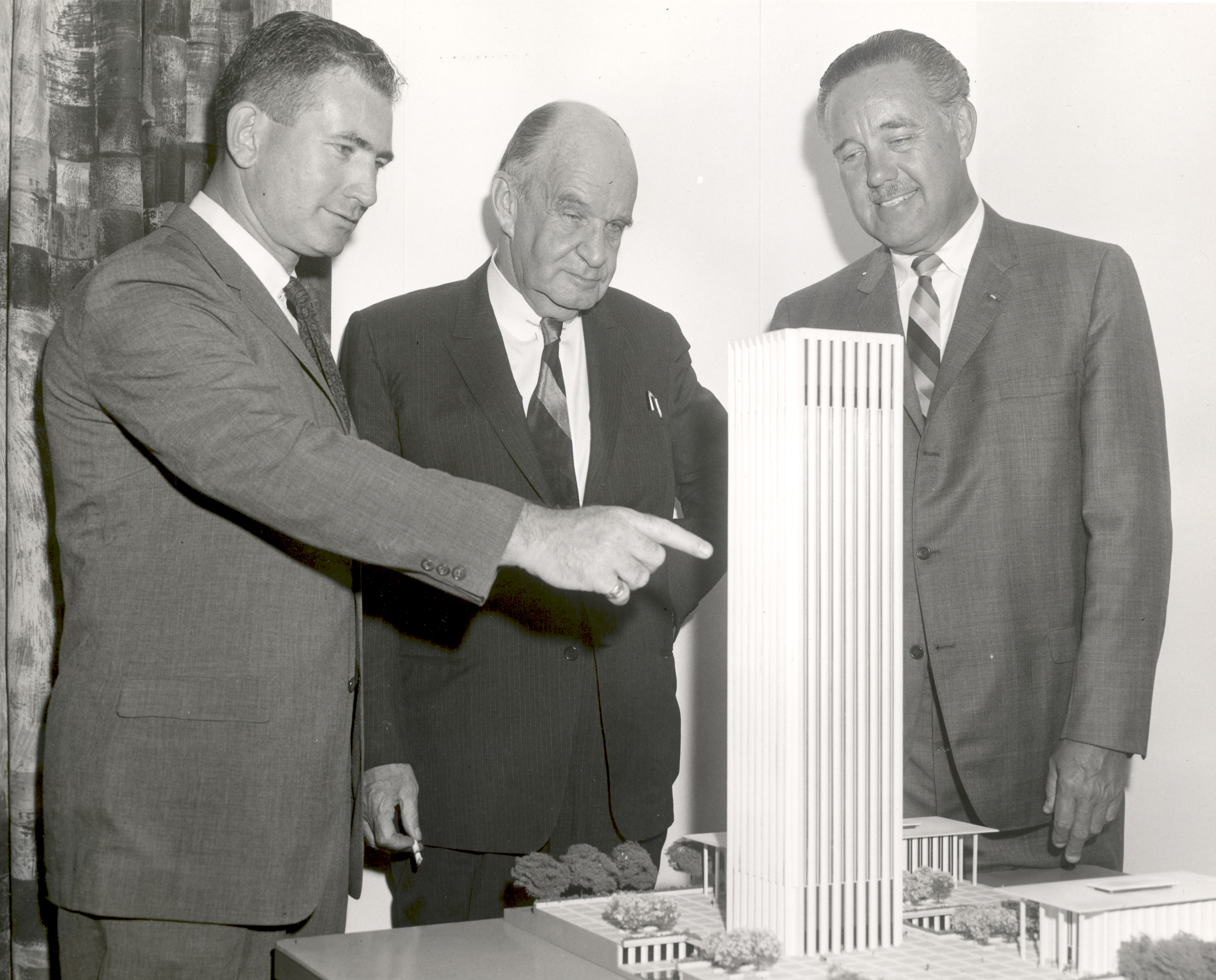
Model of the Electronics Research Centers first phase of construction is examined by (from left) Dr. Albert J. Kelley, Deputy Director; Edward Durell Stone, and Dr. Winston E. Kock, Director

The Electronics Research Center (ERC) was a NASA research facility located in Cambridge, Massachusetts, established in 1964 to serve the agency's need for internal expertise in electronics. It also administered contracts, grants, and other NASA business in New England until it closed in 1970.

Its former campus later became the site of the United States Department of Transportation's John A. Volpe National Transportation Systems Center, until they moved to a new building in 2023.

== Mission ==
During the Apollo era, the ERC helped foster NASA's electronics expertise, and also served as a hub for graduate and postgraduate training within a regional alliance of government, industry, and university organizations. Its significance was comparable to NASA's Langley Research Center and Marshall Space Flight Center.

It aimed to employ 1,600 professionals and technical experts, plus 500 people in administrative and support roles by 1968.

== History ==
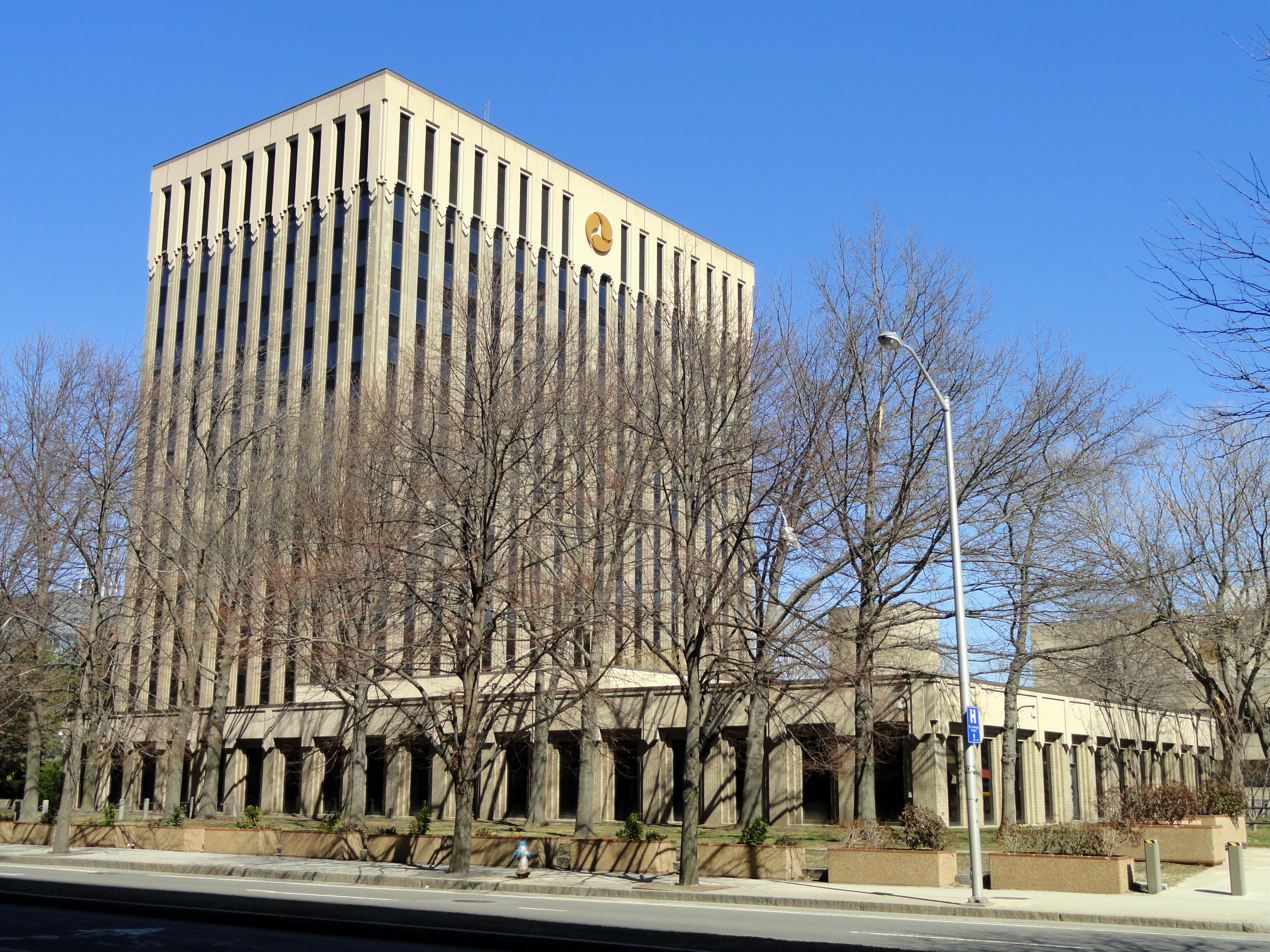
The John A. Volpe National Transportation Systems Center, originally the Electronics Research Center, in 2011

The Electronics Research Center was the subject of political controversy from the start. The center was located in Cambridge after to Massachusetts politicians' unsuccessful lobbying for the Manned Spacecraft Center.

President John F. Kennedy and NASA administrator James Webb kept the project out of the budget process until after Ted Kennedy's first election to the Senate. After the President belatedly put the ERC project in the budget process, Congress rebelled. In addition to Republican members, Representatives from the Midwest and other regions felt that they had been swindled out of the NASA budget. The issue split the Congress along both party and regional lines. As a result, the ERC had the most deliberated and defended existence and siting of any NASA Center.

The ERC opened in September 1964 as the successor to the North Eastern Operations Office, which opened in July 1962. The Center took over the administration of contracts, grants, and other NASA business in New England previously housed at the North Eastern Operations Office.

The center began operations in Technology Square on Main Street while its campus was under construction on Broadway, across the street from MIT at Kendall Square. Its location allowed it to take advantage of its proximity to MIT, and to a lesser extent Harvard University, the MIT Lincoln Laboratory, the Air Force Cambridge Research Laboratories, and the electronics industry located along Massachusetts Route 128.

=== Nature of research ===
Research at the ERC was conducted in ten laboratories:

- Space guidance systems.
- Computers instrumentation research.
- Space optics.
- Power conditioning and distribution.
- Microwave radiation.
- Electronics component qualification and standards.
- Control and information systems.

Researchers investigated such areas as microwave and laser communications; the miniaturization and radiation resistance of electronic components, guidance and control systems, photovoltaic energy conversion, information display devices, instrumentation, and computers and data processing.

Although no publication has investigated the nature of the research or professional training conducted at the ERC, an internal NASA publication lists a few accomplishments identified with the center, such as:

- A high-frequency (30 GHz) oscillator.
- A miniaturized tunnel-diode transducer.
- A transistor more tolerant of space radiation.

"One particularly interesting development," the source added, "has been in the area of holography. At the Electronics Research Center, holography has been used for data storage and has permitted a remarkable degree of data compression in the storing of star patterns" (Preliminary History, 1:V-11, 1:V-34 & 1:V-35). A book on holography written by one of the ERC's directors, Dr. Winston Kock, indicates some of the facility's contributions, such as Lowell Rosen's improvement of focused-image holography (Kock, 80-82).

NASA administrator James Webb helped shape the ERC. Webb saw it as fulfilling a broader mission as part of the nation's Cold War struggle on the economic and intellectual battleground of the Space Race. The ERC was an archetype for Webb's regional "university-industry-government complex" analogous to the military-industrial complex, organized because Webb believed that no single institution had the requisite resources to fight this war. The ERC's training of critically needed engineers and scientists served the same aim as the Cold War.

The ERC grew while NASA eliminated major programs and cut staff. Between 1967 and 1970, NASA cut permanent civil service workers at all Centers with one exception, the ERC, whose personnel grew annually. The largest cuts had been the Marshall Space Flight Center, whose future was then the subject of agency debate.

The ERC was closed in June 1970.

The ERC has received hardly any attention as a subject of scholarly or lay studies. No single work, neither book nor article, has been devoted to the ERC itself. The few works that consider the ERC other than in passing focus on the turbulent political circumstances surrounding its creation. A thesis written for the MIT Sloan School of Management is the only known work that deals solely with the facility's closing.
