= Artificial dielectrics =

Manmade materials with electromagnetic properties

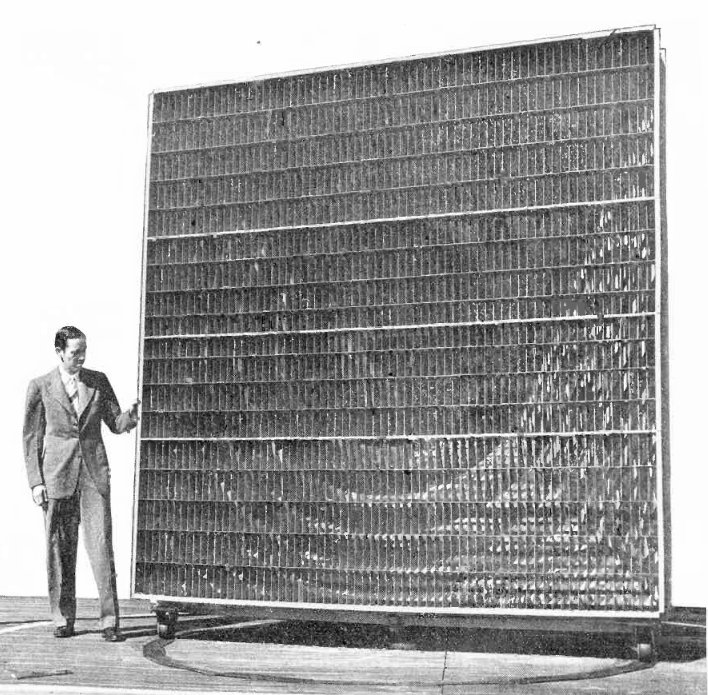
A metallic lens antenna and its inventor Winston E. Kock in 1946. This structure is one of the earliest examples of artificial dielectrics.

Artificial dielectrics are fabricated composite materials, often consisting of arrays of conductive shapes or particles in a nonconductive support matrix, designed to have specific electromagnetic properties similar to dielectrics. As long as the lattice spacing is smaller than a wavelength, these substances can refract and diffract electromagnetic waves, and are used to make lenses, diffraction gratings, mirrors, and polarizers for microwaves. These were first conceptualized, constructed and deployed for interaction in the microwave frequency range in the 1940s and 1950s. The constructed medium, the artificial dielectric, has an effective permittivity and effective permeability, as intended.

In addition, some artificial dielectrics may consist of irregular lattices, random mixtures, or a non-uniform concentration of particles.

Artificial dielectrics came into use with the radar microwave technologies developed between the 1940s and 1970s. The term "artificial dielectrics" came into use because these are macroscopic analogues of naturally occurring dielectrics. The difference between the natural and artificial substance is that the atoms or molecules are artificially (human) constructed materials. Artificial dielectrics were proposed because of the need for lightweight structures and components for various microwave delivery devices.

Artificial dielectrics are a direct historical link to metamaterials.

== Seminal work ==
The term artificial dielectric was originated by Winston E. Kock in 1948 when he was employed by Bell Laboratories. It described materials of practical dimensions that imitated the electromagnetic response of natural dielectric solids. The artificial dielectrics were borne out of a need for lightweight low loss materials for large and otherwise heavy devices.

== Dielectric analog ==
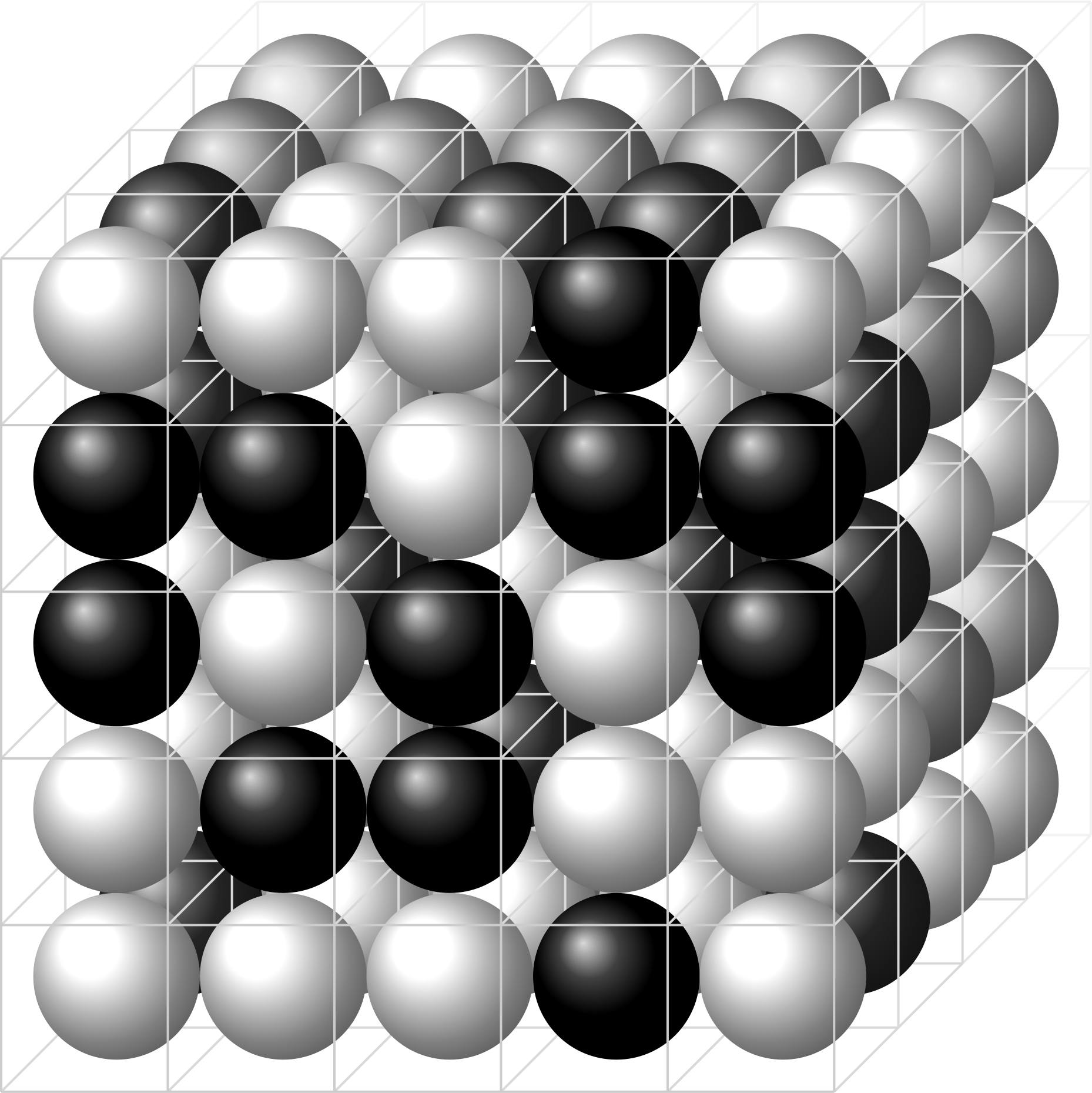
A three-dimensional lattice filled with two molecules A and B, here shown as black and white spheres.

Natural dielectrics, or natural materials, are a model for artificial dielectrics. When an electromagnetic field is applied to a natural dielectric, local responses and scattering occur on the atomic or molecular level. The macroscopic response of the material is then described as electric permittivity and magnetic permeability. However, for this macroscopic response to be valid, a type of spatial ordering must be present between the scatterers. In addition, a certain relation to the wavelength is part of its description. A lattice structure, with some degree of spatial ordering is present. Also, the applied field is longer in wavelength than the lattice spacing. This then allows for a macroscopic description expressed as electric permittivity and magnetic permeability.

In order to manufacture an artificial permittivity and permeability there must be a capability to access the atoms themselves. This degree of precision is impractical. However, in the late 1940s - in the domain of long wavelengths such as radio frequencies and microwave - it became possible to manufacture larger scale, and more accessible scatterers that mimic the local response of natural materials - along with a synthesized macroscopic response. In the radio frequency and microwave regions such artificial crystal lattice structures were assembled. The scatterers responded to an electromagnetic field like atoms and molecules in natural materials, and the media behaved much like dielectrics with an effective media response.

The scattering elements are designed to scatter the electromagnetic field in a prescribed manner. The geometric shape of the elements – spheres, disks, conducting strips, etc. – contribute to the design parameters.

== Rodded medium ==
The rodded medium (plasma medium) is also known as the wire mesh, and wire grid. It is a square lattice of thin parallel wires The initial research pertaining to this medium was conducted by J. Brown, K.E. Golden, and W. Rotman.

== Metamaterials ==
Artificial dielectrics are a direct historical link to metamaterials.
