= Walter Rotman =

American scientist (1922–2007)

Walter Rotman (August 24, 1922 – May 19, 2007) was an American scientist known for his work in radar and antenna design. Among his inventions were the Rotman lens, the sandwich wire antenna, and the trough waveguide.

== Biography ==
Walter Rotman was born on August 24, 1922, in St. Louis, Missouri. He served in the United States Air Force during World War II as a technician for the radar division. After the war, he studied electrical engineering at MIT where he received his BSc and MSc. In 1948, he joined the research laboratories of the Air Force (AFRL) where he became the branch chief of a laboratory concentrating on investigating the effect of plasma on re-entry vehicles. In 1980, he retired from AFRL and joined MIT Lincoln Laboratory where he worked on reflector antennas until his retirement in 1990. He died on May 19, 2007, at the age of 84 in Boston, Massachusetts.

== Scientific advancements ==
=== Rotman lens ===
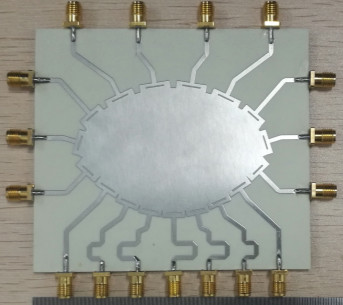
A Rotman lens

Rotman is best known for the passive electronic component named after him, the Rotman lens. The lens allows radar systems to simultaneously see targets in multiple directions (multi-beam capability) without physically moving the antenna system. This lens is now integrated into many radars and EW systems around the world.

=== Surface wave antennas ===
Rotman invented many types of surface wave antennas, including the trough waveguide, the channel waveguide, and the sandwich wire antenna. These periodic structures, which he analyzed together with Arthur Oliner, allow antennas to scan in various directions by changing frequencies. The sandwich wire antenna was one of the first attempts to use the then-new techniques of microstrip and stripline to create an antenna.

=== Metamaterials ===
Building upon previous work, Rotman used a grid of three-dimensional thin wires to simulate plasmas with dielectric constants of less than one. It is considered today as a classic paper as it showed the potential of artificial dielectrics. In this paper, Rotman reached equations in a relatively simple manner which were derived again twenty years later. However, Rotman did not attempt to use these grids to simulate negative epsilon material, possibly because he saw the difficulties with dispersion and loss which would occur.

== Published works and achievements ==
Rotman wrote several classic works and papers on the interference of radar plasma, re-entry vehicles, and the simulation of plasmas via a grid of thin rods, which was an early inspiration for today's work on metamaterials. Rotman was awarded many honors. He was elected an IEEE Fellow in 1968 for contributions to antenna technology. He received the IEEE Centennial Medal in 1984 and the USAF Decoration for Exceptional Civilian Service in 1980, and the John Kraus Antenna Award in 2005.
