= Nader Engheta =

Iranian-American scientist (born 1955)

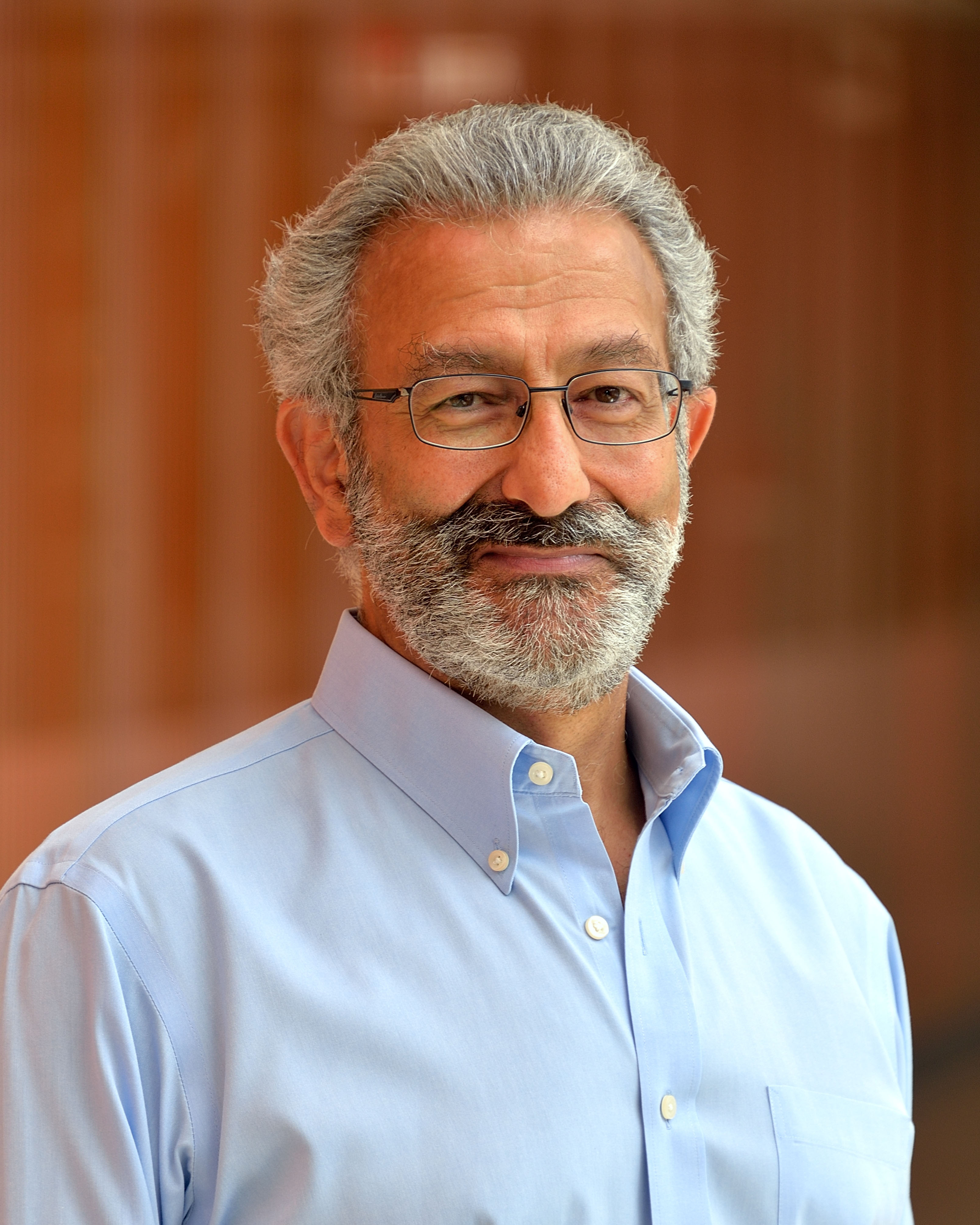
- Engheta in August 2022
- Born: October 8, 1955 (age 71); Tehran, Iran
- Education: California Institute of Technology; University of Tehran
- Awards: Guggenheim Fellowship (1999); IEEE Electromagnetics Award (2012); Balthasar van der Pol Gold Medal from URSI (2014); SPIE Gold Medal (2015); IEEE Pioneer Award in Nanotechnology (2018); Max Born Award (2020); Isaac Newton Medal (2020); Franklin Medal (2023)
- Scientific career
- Fields: Physics, electrical engineering
- Workplaces: University of Pennsylvania
- Thesis: On the Radiation Patterns of Interfacial Antennas (1982)
- Doctoral advisor: Charles H. Papas
- Notable students: Andrea Alù

Nader Engheta (Persian: نادر انقطاع; born October 8, 1955) is an Iranian-American scientist and professor at the University of Pennsylvania. He has contributed to the fields of metamaterials, transformation optics, plasmonic optics, nanophotonics, graphene photonics, nano-materials, nanoscale optics, nano-antennas and miniaturized antennas, physics and reverse-engineering of polarization vision in nature, bio-inspired optical imaging, fractional paradigm in electrodynamics, and electromagnetics and microwaves.

== Background ==
Engheta was born on October 8, 1955, in Tehran. After earning a B.S. degree from the school of engineering (Daneshkadeh-e-Fanni) of the University of Tehran, he left for the United States in the summer of 1978 and earned his master's and PhD degrees from the California Institute of Technology.

He is one of the original scientists in the field of modern metamaterials and the originator of the fields of near-zero-index metamaterials, plasmonic cloaking and optical nano circuitry (optical metatronics).

His primary work is in metamaterial-based optical nano circuitry, in which properly designed nano structures function as lumped optical circuit elements such as optical capacitors, optical inductors and optical resistors. These are the building blocks for the metatronic circuits operating with light. This concept has been recently verified and realized experimentally by him and his research group at the University of Pennsylvania. This provides a new circuit paradigm for information processing at the nanoscale.

His near-zero-index structures exhibit unique properties in light–matter interaction that have provided new possibilities in nanophotonics.

His plasmonic cloaking ideas have led to new methods in stealth physics.

He and his group have developed several areas and concepts in the fields of metamaterials and plasmonic optics, including, (1) ‘extreme-parameter metamaterials’ and 'epsilon-near-zero (ENZ) metamaterials'; (2) the concept of Omega structures, as one of the building blocks of structured materials; (3) ultrathin cavities and waveguides, with sizes beyond diffraction limits, providing possibilities for unprecedented miniaturization of devices; (4) supercoupling phenomena between waveguides using low-permittivity ENZ metamaterials; (5) extended Purcell effects in nano-optics using the ENZ phenomena, in which enhanced photon density of states occurs in a relatively large area with essentially uniform phase; (6) far-field subwavelength imaging lens based on ENZ hyperbolic metamaterials; (7) scattering-cancellation-based plasmonic cloaking and transparency; (8) merging the field of graphene with the field of metamaterials and plasmonic optics in the infrared regime, providing the roadmaps for one-atom-thick optical devices and one-atom-thick information processing; (9) microwave artificial chirality; (10) “signal-processing” metamaterials and “meta-machine”, and (11) “digital” metamaterials.

He has been the H. Nedwill Ramsey Professor at the University of Pennsylvania since January 2005, affiliated with the departments of Electrical and Systems Engineering, Bioengineering, Materials Science and Engineering, and Physics and Astronomy. In 2026, he was elected as a member of the National Academy of Engineering "for contributions to the development of metamaterials and their applications".

== Awards and honors ==
Engheta has received the following honors and awards:

- IEEE Legends of Electromagnetics Award (2026)
- Elected member of National Academy of Engineering (2026)
- Rolf Landauer Medal (2025)
- Elected member of Academia Europaea (2024)
- Caltech Distinguished Alumni Award (2023)
- Elected to the American Academy of Arts and Sciences (2023)
- Franklin Medal in Electrical Engineering (2023)
- Hermann Anton Haus Lecture, MIT (April 13, 2022)
- Isaac Newton Medal (2020)
- Max Born Award (2020)
- Canadian Academy of Engineering, International Fellow (2019)
- Ellis Island Medal of Honor from the Ellis Island Honors Society (2019)
- Pioneer Award in Nanotechnology from IEEE Nanotechnology Council (2018)
- Highly Cited Researcher (Clarivate Analytics, Top 1% Researcher most cited) (2017 & 2018)
- William Streifer Scientific Achievement Award from IEEE Photonics Society (2017)
- Beacon of Photonics Industry Award from Photonics Media (2017)
- Honorary Doctorate from National Technical University Kharkov Polytechnic Institute (2017)
- Honorary Doctorate from University of Stuttgart, Germany (2016)
- Honorary Doctorate in Technology from Aalto University in Finland (2016)
- SPIE Gold Medal (2015)
- Vannevar Bush Faculty Fellow Award from the US Department of Defense (2015)
- Distinguished Achievement Award from the IEEE Antennas and Propagation Society (2015)
- Wheatstone Lecture in King's College London (2015)
- Balthasar van der Pol Gold Medal from URSI (International Union of Radio Science) (2014)
- Inaugural SINA Award in Engineering (SINA: "Spirit of Iranian Noted Achiever") (2013)
- Benjamin Franklin Key Award (2013)
- IEEE Electromagnetics Award (2012)
- Fellow of the Institute of Physics (UK) (2020)
- Fellow of the Union Radio-Scientifique Internationale (URSI: International Union of Radio Science) (since 2017)
- Fellow of the US National Academy of Inventors (NAI) (2015)
- Fellow of the Materials Research Society (MRS) (since 2015)
- Fellow of the SPIE- The International Society for Optical Engineering (since 2011)
- Fellow of the American Association for the Advancement of Science (AAAS) (since 2010)
- Fellow of the American Physical Society (APS) (since November 2008)
- Fellow of the Optical Society of America (OSA) (since March 1999)
- Fellow of the Institute of Electrical and Electronics Engineers (IEEE) (since January 1996)
- Recipient of the George H. Heilmeier Faculty Award 2008 for Excellence in Research
- In Scientific American Magazine List of 50 Leaders in Science and Technology, 2006
- IEEE Third Millennium Medal
- Guggenheim Fellowship (1999)
- UPS Foundation Distinguished Educator term Chair
- Fulbright Naples Chair Award (1998)
- S. Reid Warren Jr. Award (two times: 1993 and 2001)
- IEEE Antennas and Propagation Society (AP-S) Distinguished Lecturer for 1997–1999
- W. M. Keck Foundation's Engineering Teaching Excellence Award (1995)
- Christian F. and Mary R. Lindback Foundation Award (1994)
- NSF Presidential Young Investigator (PYI) Award (1989)

== Books ==
- Engheta, Nader; Ziolkowski, Richard W., eds. (July 2006). Metamaterials: Physics and Engineering Explorations. Wiley-IEEE Press. p. 440. ISBN 978-0-471-76102-0.
