= Costas Soukoulis =

Greek physicist (1951–2024)

Costas M. Soukoulis
- Κώστας Μ. Σούκουλης
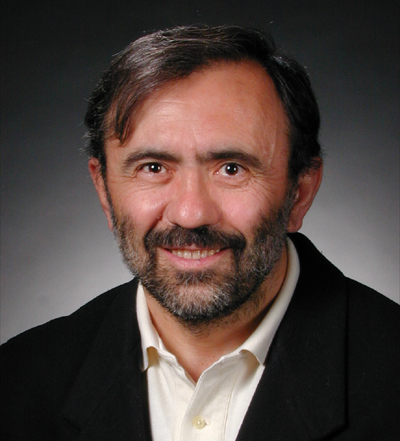
- Soukoulis in 2014
- Born: 15 January 1951; Corinth, Greece
- Died: 14 March 2024 (aged 73); Ames, Iowa, U.S.
- Known for: Photonic crystal; Random lasers; Metamaterials; Light localization
- Awards: Rolf Landauer Medal (2015); Max Born Award (2014); James C. McGroddy Prize for New Materials (2013); Honorary Doctorate from the Vrije University in Brussels (2011); Frances M. Craig endowed chair in Physics Dept. at Iowa State University (2007); Descartes Prize (2005); Humboldt Research Award (2002); Fellow of the APS, OSA, AAAS, and NAI
- Scientific career
- Fields: Physics, materials science
- Institutions: University of Athens; University of Chicago; University of Virginia; Exxon Research Laboratory; Ames Laboratory – Iowa State University; IESL – Forth Research Center
- Doctoral advisor: Kathryn Liebermann Levin

Costas M. Soukoulis (Greek: Κώστας Μ. Σούκουλης; 15 January 1951 – 14 March 2024) was a Greek physicist, who was a senior scientist in the Ames Laboratory and a Distinguished Professor of Physics Emeritus at Iowa State University. He received his B.Sc. from University of Athens in 1974. He obtained his Ph.D. in Physics from the University of Chicago in 1978, under the supervision of Kathryn Liebermann Levin. From 1978 to 1981 he was at the Physics Department at University of Virginia. He spent three years (1981–1984) at Exxon Research and Engineering Co. and from 1984 was at Iowa State University (ISU) and Ames Laboratory. He was part-time Professor at the Department of Materials Science and Technology of the University of Crete (2001–2011) and an associated member of IESL-FORTH at Heraklion, Crete, Greece, since 1984. He died on 14 March 2024, at the age of 73.

== Research ==
Soukoulis and his collaborators at Ames Lab/ISU in 1990 and 1994, suggested photonic crystal designs (lattice diamond and the woodpile structure, respectively), which gave the largest omnidirectional photonic band gaps. Many experimental groups all over the world still use his woodpile structure to fabricate photonic crystals at optical wavelengths, enhance the spontaneous emission and produce nanolasers with low threshold limit. Soukoulis and Wegener demonstrate magnetic responses and negative index of refraction at optical frequencies in metamaterials, which do not exist in natural materials. His other researches includes light and Anderson localization, random lasers, graphene and plasmonics.

== Awards and honours ==
- He was a Fellow of the American Physical Society (1991), Optical Society (2003), American Association for the Advancement of Science (2002), and National Academy of Inventors (2018).
- He was a recipient of Senior Humboldt Research Award (2002), and the first Frances M. Craig endowed chair in Physics Department at ISU (2007).
- Soukoulis shared (Pendry, Smith, Özbay and Wegener) the 2005 Descartes Prize, awarded by the European Union, for contributions to metamaterials.
- Honorary Doctorate from Vrije University in Brussels (2011).
- Soukoulis, Pendry and Smith recipients of the 2013 APS James C. McGroddy Prize “for discovery of metamaterials.”
- He was a recipient of the 2014 Max Born Award given by the OSA.
- Soukoulis was selected in 2014, 2015 and 2016 among the Highly Cited Researchers published by Thomson-Reuters.
- The Rolf Landauer Medal of the International ETOPIM Association (2015).
