= George V. Eleftheriades =

Canadian materials scientist

- Born: March 15, 1965 (age 61); Limassol, Cyprus
- Education: National Technical University of Athens; University of Michigan
- Known for: Contribution to metamaterials
- Scientific career
- Fields: Electrical engineering
- Workplaces: University of Toronto
- Thesis: Analysis and design of integrated-circuit horn antennas for millimeter and submillimeter wave applications (1993)
- Doctoral advisor: Gabriel M. Rebeiz
- Website: www.metawave-group.com

George V. Eleftheriades is a Cypriot-Canadian electrical engineer and researcher in the field of metamaterials. He held a Canada Research Chair at the University of Toronto and is a professor in the Department of Electrical and Computer Engineering there. He has received notable awards for his achievements and is a fellow of the IEEE, the Royal Society of Canada, and a foreign member of the US National Academy of Engineering.

At the University of Toronto, he heads a group for research in novel electromagnetic materials. He has also contributed chapters to several books on antennas and transmission line theory that utilize metamaterials, along with other novel concepts, and is co-editor of one book in the same field. Eleftheriades is also the author and co-author of a significant volume of published research in peer reviewed journals. Mr. Eleftheriades earned his Ph.D. and M.S.E.E. degrees in Electrical Engineering from the University of Michigan, Ann Arbor, in 1993 and 1989 respectively. He received a diploma (with distinction) in Electrical Engineering from the National Technical University of Athens, Greece in 1988.

== Awards and recognitions ==
Eleftheriades was elected IEEE fellow "for contributions to conception, analysis and fabrication of electromagnetic materials and their applications."

== Awards and honors ==
Eleftheriades is an IEEE Fellow (2006), a Fellow of the Royal Society of Canada (2009), and a Fellow of the Canadian Academy of Engineering. In 2026, he was elected as an International Member of the National Academy of Engineering for his "contributions to engineered surfaces and metasurfaces for antennas, cloaking, and sub-diffraction imaging."

His major professional awards include:

- IEEE Electromagnetics Award (2025)
- IEEE Antennas and Propagation Society Distinguished Achievement Award (2019)
- IEEE AP-S John Kraus Antenna Award (2015)
- He received the 2008 IEEE Kiyo Tomiyasu Award, a Technical Field Award conferred by the IEEE Board of Directors.
- In 2004, he was awarded the E.W.R. Steacie Memorial Fellowship by the Natural Sciences and Engineering Research Council of Canada.
- In 2001, he received the Ontario Premier's Research Excellence Award and the University of Toronto's Gordon Slemon Award.

He has also received multiple best paper awards, including the R.W.P. King Best Paper Award (2008, 2012) and the Piergiorgio L. E. Uslenghi Best Paper Award (2014).

== Published works ==
=== Books ===
- Eleftheriades, G. V.; Balmain, K. G. (2005). Negative-refraction metamaterials : fundamental properties and applications. John Wiley & Sons. ISBN 9780471744740.
