= Curvature renormalization group method =

In theoretical physics, the curvature renormalization group (CRG) method is an analytical approach to determine the phase boundaries and the critical behavior of topological systems. Topological phases are phases of matter that appear in certain quantum mechanical systems at zero temperature because of a robust degeneracy in the ground-state wave function. They are called topological because they can be described by different (discrete) values of a nonlocal topological invariant. This is to contrast with non-topological phases of matter (e.g. ferromagnetism) that can be described by different values of a local order parameter. States with different values of the topological invariant cannot change into each other without a phase transition. The topological invariant is constructed from a curvature function that can be calculated from the bulk Hamiltonian of the system. At the phase transition, the curvature function diverges, and the topological invariant correspondingly jumps abruptly from one value to another. The CRG method works by detecting the divergence in the curvature function, and thus determining the boundaries between different topological phases. Furthermore, from the divergence of the curvature function, it extracts scaling laws that describe the critical behavior, i.e. how different quantities (such as susceptibility or correlation length) behave as the topological phase transition is approached. The CRG method has been successfully applied to a variety of static, periodically driven, weakly and strongly interacting systems to classify the nature of the corresponding topological phase transitions.

== Background ==
Topological phases are quantum phases of matter that are characterized by robust ground state degeneracy and quantized geometric phases. Transitions between different topological phases are usually called topological phase transitions, which are characterized by discrete jumps of the topological invariant $\mathcal{C}$. Upon tuning one or multiple system parameters $\mathbf{M} = (\mathbf{M}_1 , \mathbf{M}_2, \dots)$, $\mathcal{C}$ jumps abruptly from one integer to another at the critical point $\mathbf{M}_c$. Typically, the topological invariant $\mathcal{C}$ takes the form of an integration of a curvature function $F(\mathbf{k})$ in momentum space:

Behavior of the curvature function (Berry connection) for the Kitaev model (top panel) as a function of a parameter change in parameter space (bottom panel). The vertical red lines depict topological phase boundaries. Across the topological phase transitions, the Berry connection diverges and flips sign around the high-symmetry points k=0.

$$\mathcal{C} = \int \mathrm{d}^D k \, \, F(\mathbf{k}, {\bf M}).$$
Depending on the dimensionality and symmetries of the system, the curvature function can be a Berry connection, a Berry curvature, or a more complicated object.

In the vicinity of high symmetry points ${\bf k}_{0}={\bf k}_{0}+{\bf G}$ in a $D$-dimensional momentum space, where ${\bf G}$ is a reciprocal lattice vector, the curvature function typically displays a Lorentzian shape
$$F({\bf k}_{0}+\delta{\bf k},{\bf M})=\frac{F({\bf k}_{0},{\bf M})}{1+\xi^{2}\delta k^{2}}\,,$$
where $1/\xi$ defines the width of the multidimensional peak. Approaching the critical point ${\bf M}\rightarrow{\bf M}_{c}$ the peak gradually diverges, flipping sign across the transition:
$$\lim_{\mathbf{M} \rightarrow \mathbf{M}_c^+} F( \mathbf{k}_0,\mathbf{M}) = -\lim_{\mathbf{M} \rightarrow \mathbf{M}_c^-} F(\mathbf{k}_0, \mathbf{M})=\pm\infty, \;\; \lim_{\mathbf{M} \rightarrow \mathbf{M}_c} \xi=\infty\;,$$
This behavior is displayed in the video on the side for the case $D=1$.

== Scaling laws, critical exponents, and universality ==
The divergence of the curvature function permits the definition of critical exponents $\gamma,\nu$ as
$$|F({\bf k}_{0},{\bf M})|\propto|{\bf M}-{\bf M}_{c}|^{-\gamma},\;\;\;\;\;\xi\propto|{\bf M}-{\bf M}_{c}|^{-\nu}.$$
The conservation of the topological invariant $\mathcal{C}=\mathrm{const.}$, as the transition is approached from one side or the other, yields a scaling law that constraints the exponents
$$\gamma=D\nu,$$
where $D$ is the dimensionality of the problem. These exponents serve to classify topological phase transitions into different universality classes.

To experimentally measure the critical exponents, one needs to have access to the curvature function with a certain level of accuracy. Good candidates at present are quantum engineered photonics and ultracold atomic systems. In the first case, the curvature function can be extracted from the anomalous displacement of wave packets under optical pulse pumping in coupled fibre loops. For ultracold atoms in optical lattices, the Berry curvature can be achieved through quantum interference or force-induced wave-packet velocity measurements.

== Correlation function ==
The Fourier transform of the curvature function
$$\tilde{F}({\bf R})=\int \frac{d^{D}{\bf k}}{(2\pi)^{D}}\;e^{i{\bf k}\cdot{\bf R}}\;F({\bf k},M)$$
typically measures the overlap of certain quantum mechanical wave functions or more complicated objects, and therefore it is interpreted as a correlation function. For instance, if the curvature function is the noninteracting or many-body Berry connection or Berry curvature, the correlation function $\tilde{F}({\bf R})$ is a measure of the overlap of Wannier functions centered at two home cells that are distance ${\bf R}$ apart. Because of the Lorentzian shape of the curvature function mentioned above, the Fourier transform of the curvature function decays with the length scale $\xi$. Hence, $\xi$ is interpreted as the correlation length, and its critical exponent is assigned to be $\nu$ like in Landau theory. Furthermore, the correlation length is related to the localization length of topological edge states, such as Majorana modes.

== Scaling equation ==
The scaling procedure that identifies the topological phase transitions is based on the divergence of the curvature function. It is an iterative procedure that, for a given parameter set ${\bf M}$ that controls the topology, searches for a new parameter set ${\bf M}^{\prime}$ that satisfies
$$F({\bf k}_0, {\bf M}^{\prime}) = F({\bf k}_0 + \delta {\bf k}, {\bf M}),$$
where ${\bf k}_{0}$ is a high-symmetry point and $\delta {\bf k}$ is a small deviation away from it. This procedure searches for the path in the parameter space of ${\bf M}$ along which the divergence of the curvature function reduces, yielding a renormalization group flow that flows away from the topological phase transitions. The name "curvature renormalization group" is derived precisely from this procedure that renormalizes the profile of the curvature function. Writing $\mathrm{d}M_{i} = M_{i}^{\prime} - M_{i}$and $\delta k_j^2 \equiv \mathrm{d}l$, and expanding the scaling equation above to leading order yields the generic renormalization group equation

Topological phase diagram of the periodically driven Kitaev chain obtained with the curvature renormalization group method

$$\frac{\mathrm{d}M_{i}}{\mathrm{d} l} = \frac{1}{2} \frac{\partial^2_k F({\bf k}, {\bf M}) \big|_{k=k_0}}{\partial_{M_{i}} F({\bf k}_{0}, {\bf M})}.$$
The renormalization group flow can be obtained directly as a stream plot of the right hand side of this differential equation. Numerically, this differential equation only requires the evaluation of the curvature function at few momenta. Hence, the method is a very efficient way to identify topological phase transitions, especially in periodically driven systems (aka Floquet systems) and interacting systems.

== See also ==
- Topological quantum number
- Berry connection and curvature
- Topological insulator
- Periodic table of topological invariants
- Dirac matter
- Landau theory
- Critical exponent
- Scaling law
- Correlation function (statistical mechanics)
- Universality (dynamical systems)
- Renormalization group
- Floquet theory
- Majorana fermion
- Surface states
