= Anomalous velocity =

Concept in condensed matter physics

In wave mechanics, anomalous velocity refers to the group velocity of a wave packet that is transverse to an applied electric field, arising even in the absence of a magnetic field. It results from the interference of wave functions and is thus a quantum mechanical effect for the case of electrons.

When an electric field is applied to a system, electron wave packets are generally expected to move along the direction of the field. However, due to the presence of Berry curvature in momentum space, wave packets can exhibit a motion transverse to the electric field, known as anomalous motion. This phenomenon is not limited to electrons but also applies to other wave-like particles such as photons and ultracold atoms.

== Related phenomena and formulation ==
Anomalous velocity underpins various Hall-like transport phenomena. Examples include the anomalous Hall effect in ferromagnets, the spin Hall effect in systems with significant spin-orbit coupling, and spin-dependent beam shifts in photonic systems such as the Imbert–Fedorov shift. These effects are manifestations of the topological and geometric structure of quantum states in reciprocal space, mediated by the Berry curvature, which acts as an effective magnetic field in momentum space.

The dynamics of an electron wave packet under an electric field can be described by the following equations:

$\dot{r}_c = \nabla_{\vec{k}} \varepsilon(\vec{k}) - \dot{\vec{k}} \times \vec{\Omega}(\vec{k})$ (1)

$\hbar \dot{\vec{k}} = -e \vec{E}$ (2)

where $r_c$ is the center of the wave packet, $\varepsilon(\vec{k})$ is the band energy, and $\vec{E}$ is the external electric field. $\vec{\Omega}(\vec{k})$ denotes the Berry curvature, defined as the curl of the Berry connection $\vec{A}(\vec{k})$. The second term in the expression for $\dot{r}_c$ captures the contribution from the Berry curvature, which gives rise to the transverse anomalous motion.

== Intuitive approach ==
While the derivation of the anomalous velocity in equation (1) is thorough, it does not offer as much intuitive understanding as the derivation of the ordinary group velocity. It has been shown that a more intuitive approach can be obtained by following the steps used in the derivation of the ordinary group velocity, but applied to Bloch wave functions—that is, by adding two Bloch wave functions with slightly different momenta.

The time evolution of a Bloch wave function is given by

$\Psi_{\vec{k}}(\vec{r}, t) = u_{\vec{k}}(\vec{r}) e^{i \int^t dt' \left( \vec{k} \cdot \dot{\vec{r}} - \tilde{\omega}_{\vec{k}} \right)}$ (3)

where the integral in the exponent accounts for the possible time dependence of the momentum, and the frequency is effectively modified $\tilde{\omega}_{\vec{k}} \equiv \omega_{\vec{k}} - i \dot{\vec{k}} \cdot \langle u_{\vec{k}}|\nabla_{\vec{k}}| u_{\vec{k}} \rangle$, to include the Berry phase factor.

Using the Bloch wave function form in equation (3), two Bloch wave functions with slightly different momenta are expressed as

$\Psi_{\vec{k} \pm \delta \vec{k}}(\vec{r}, t) \approx \left[ u_{\vec{k}}(\vec{r}) \pm \sum_{\mu} \delta k_{\mu} \frac{\partial u_{\vec{k}}(\vec{r})}{\partial k_{\mu}} \right] e^{i \int^t dt' \left( \vec{k} \cdot \dot{\vec{r}} - \tilde{\omega}_{\vec{k}} \right)} e^{\pm i \int^t dt' \left( \delta \vec{k} \cdot \dot{\vec{r}} - \delta \tilde{\omega}_{\vec{k}} \right)}$ (4)

Following the standard procedure for calculating ordinary group velocity, one can add the two wave functions in equations (4) and track the envelope function to determine the resulting group velocity. It has been shown that the motion of the envelope function of the summed wave function $\Psi_{\text{sum}} = \left( \Psi_{\vec{k} + \delta \vec{k}} + \Psi_{\vec{k} - \delta \vec{k}} \right)/2$ leads to the anomalous velocity described in equation (1).

== Numerical visualization of anomalous velocity ==
Transverse group velocity (anomalous velocity) in a square lattice of $p_x-ip_y~(L=-\hbar)$ orbitals. Colors indicate the phase of the wave function. The phase circulates around each atom due to local angular momentum and flows predominantly to the right with a high phase velocity. The dark region marked by the white arrow represents a node in the envelope function moving transversely, illustrating the anomalous velocity. Note that this anomalous velocity is much smaller than both the ordinary longitudinal velocity and the phase velocity.

Visualization of group velocity can be achieved by plotting the superposed wave function. In the case of ordinary group velocity, the superposition of two plane waves with slightly different wave vectors produces an envelope that moves differently from the constituent waves. However, this approach cannot directly illustrate anomalous velocity. Demonstrating anomalous motion in a periodic potential requires two key modifications: (1) simulations must be performed in two or higher spatial dimensions, and (2) Bloch wave functions must be used instead of plane waves. Such simulations have been implemented using square p-orbital lattices (see the figure).

== See also ==
- Berry connection and curvature
- Hall effect
