= Orbital magnetization =

Quantized magnetization of charged particles

In quantum mechanics, orbital magnetization, M_{orb}, refers to the magnetization induced by orbital motion of charged particles, usually electrons in solids. The term "orbital" distinguishes it from the contribution of spin degrees of freedom, M_{spin}, to the total magnetization. A nonzero orbital magnetization requires broken time-reversal symmetry, which can occur spontaneously in ferromagnetic and ferrimagnetic materials, or can be induced in a non-magnetic material by an applied magnetic field.

== Definitions ==
The orbital magnetic moment of a finite system, such as a molecule, is given classically by

$$\mathbf{m}_{\rm orb} = \frac{1}{2}\int \mathbf{r}\times\mathbf{J}(\mathbf{r}) \ d^3\mathbf{r}$$

where J(r) is the current density at point r. (Here SI units are used; in Gaussian units, the prefactor would be 1/2c instead, where c is the speed of light.) In a quantum-mechanical context, this can also be written as

$$\mathbf{m}_{\rm orb} = \frac{-e}{2m_e} \langle\Psi \vert\mathbf{L} \vert\Psi\rangle$$

where −e and m_{e} are the charge and mass of the electron, Ψ is the ground-state wave function, and L is the angular momentum operator. The total magnetic moment is

$$\mathbf{m} = \mathbf{m}_{\rm orb} + \mathbf{m}_{\rm spin}$$

where the spin contribution is intrinsically quantum-mechanical and is given by

$$\mathbf{m}_{\rm spin} = \frac{-g_s\mu_{\rm B}}{\hbar} \, \langle\Psi \vert\mathbf{S} \vert\Psi\rangle$$

where g_{s} is the electron spin g-factor, μ_{B} is the Bohr magneton, ħ is the reduced Planck constant, and S is the electron spin operator.

The orbital magnetization M is defined as the orbital moment density; i.e., orbital moment per unit volume. For a crystal of volume V composed of isolated entities (e.g., molecules) labelled by an index j having magnetic moments m_{orb, j}, this is

$$\mathbf{M}_{\rm orb} = \frac{1}{V}\sum_{j\in V} \mathbf{m}_{{\rm orb},j} \;.$$

However, real crystals are made up out of atomic or molecular constituents whose charge clouds overlap, so that the above formula cannot be taken as a fundamental definition of orbital magnetization. Only recently have theoretical developments led to a proper theory of orbital magnetization in crystals, as explained below.

== Theory ==
=== Difficulties in the definition of orbital magnetization ===
For a magnetic crystal, it is tempting to try to define

$$\mathbf{M}_{\rm orb} = \frac{1}{2V} \int_V \mathbf{r}\times\mathbf{J}(\mathbf{r}) \ d^3\mathbf{r}$$

where the limit is taken as the volume V of the system becomes large. However, because of the factor of r in the integrand, the integral has contributions from surface currents that cannot be neglected, and as a result the above equation does not lead to a bulk definition of orbital magnetization.

Another way to see that there is a difficulty is to try to write down the quantum-mechanical expression for the orbital magnetization in terms of the occupied single-particle Bloch functions |ψ_{n k}⟩ of band n and crystal momentum k:

$$\mathbf{M}_{\rm orb} = \frac{-e}{2m_e} \sum_n \int_{\rm BZ} \frac{1}{(2\pi)^3}\, \langle\psi_{n\mathbf{k}}\vert\mathbf{r}\times\mathbf{p}\vert \psi_{n\mathbf{k}}\rangle \, d^3 k \, ,$$

where p is the momentum operator, L = r × p, and the integral is evaluated over the Brillouin zone (BZ). However, because the Bloch functions are extended, the matrix element of a quantity containing the r operator is ill-defined, and this formula is actually ill-defined.

=== Atomic sphere approximation ===
In practice, orbital magnetization is often computed by decomposing space into non-overlapping spheres centered on atoms (similar in spirit to the muffin-tin approximation), computing the integral of r × J(r) inside each sphere, and summing the contributions. This approximation neglects the contributions from currents in the interstitial regions between the atomic spheres. Nevertheless, it is often a good approximation because the orbital currents associated with partially filled d and f shells are typically strongly localized inside these atomic spheres. It remains, however, an approximate approach.

=== Modern theory of orbital magnetization ===
A general and exact formulation of the theory of orbital magnetization was developed in the mid-2000s by several authors, first based on a semiclassical approach, then on a derivation from the Wannier representation, and finally from a long-wavelength expansion. The resulting formula for the orbital magnetization, specialized to zero temperature, is

$$\mathbf{M}_{\rm orb} = \frac{e}{2\hbar} \sum_{n}\int_{\rm BZ}\frac{1}{(2\pi)^{3}}\,f_{n\mathbf{k}}\;
\operatorname{Im}\; \left\langle \frac{\partial u_{n\mathbf{k}}}{\partial{\mathbf{k}}}\right|
\times \left(H_{\mathbf{k}} + E_{n\mathbf{k}} - 2\mu\right)
\left| \frac{\partial u_{n\mathbf{k}}}{\partial{\mathbf{k}}} \right\rangle \, d^3 k \, ,$$

where f_{n k} is 0 or 1 respectively as the band energy E_{n k} falls above or below the Fermi energy μ,

$$H_\mathbf{k} = e^{-i\mathbf{k} \cdot \mathbf{r}} H e^{i\mathbf{k} \cdot \mathbf{r}}$$

is the effective Hamiltonian at wavevector k, and

$$u_{n\mathbf{k}}(\mathbf{r}) = e^{-i\mathbf{k} \cdot \mathbf{r}} \psi_{n\mathbf{k}}(\mathbf{r})$$

is the cell-periodic Bloch function satisfying

$$H_{\mathbf{k}} \left| u_{n\mathbf{k}} \right\rangle = E_{n\mathbf{k}} \left| u_{n\mathbf{k}} \right\rangle\;.$$

A generalization to finite temperature is also available. Note that the term involving the band energy E_{n k} in this formula is really just an integral of the band energy times the Berry curvature. Results computed using the above formula have appeared in the literature. A recent review summarizes these developments.

== Experiments ==
The orbital magnetization of a material can be determined accurately by measuring the gyromagnetic ratio γ, i.e., the ratio between the magnetic dipole moment of a body and its angular momentum. The gyromagnetic ratio is related to the spin and orbital magnetization according to

$$\gamma = 1 + \frac{M_\mathrm{orb}}{(M_\mathrm{spin}+M_\mathrm{orb})}$$

The two main experimental techniques are based either on the Barnett effect or the Einstein–de Haas effect. Experimental data for Fe, Co, Ni, and their alloys have been compiled.
