= Quantum geometry (condensed matter) =

Aspect of theoretical physics

Quantum geometry in condensed matter physics refers to gauge-invariant geometric properties of quantum states as functions of external parameters—most commonly the crystal momentum of Bloch-band eigenstates in a periodic solid. It provides a geometric language for how a band wavefunction changes across parameter space and how its phase twists under parallel transport with consequences for semiclassical transport, topological band invariants, localization, and superconductivity in multiband and flat-band systems.

In many settings, quantum geometry is encoded in the quantum geometric tensor (QGT), a complex tensor field over parameter space. For a single isolated quantum state, the real (symmetric) part of the QGT defines a Riemannian metric called the quantum metric (equivalently, the pullback of the Fubini–Study metric on projective Hilbert space), while the imaginary (antisymmetric) part is the Berry curvature.

In crystalline solids, Berry curvature governs geometric contributions to semiclassical dynamics (including anomalous velocity terms) and underlies topological invariants such as Chern numbers that control quantized Hall responses. The quantum metric measures distances on the space of states and is tied to wavefunction localization, Wannier function spreads, interband matrix elements, and geometric contributions to response functions (for example, current noise and superfluid weight).

== Background ==
A physical pure quantum state is not a single Hilbert-space vector $|\psi\rangle$, but rather a ray, an equivalence class of vectors $[|\psi\rangle]$, because vectors that differ only by an overall phase like $|\psi\rangle$ and $e^{i\phi}|\psi\rangle$ represent the same physical state. Geometric structures relevant to physics must therefore be invariant under local changes of phase (gauge transformations).

Geometric ideas in quantum mechanics include both distance measures on the space of rays—formalized by the Fubini–Study metric and related notions of statistical distance—and phase geometry captured by the geometric phase and its associated connection and curvature. Provost and Vallée introduced a natural Riemannian structure on manifolds of quantum states induced by the Hilbert-space inner product, a construction that underlies the modern quantum geometric tensor formalism used in condensed matter physics.

== Quantum geometric tensor ==
=== Definition and gauge invariance ===
Let $\mathcal{H}$ be a complex Hilbert space and $|u(\boldsymbol{\lambda})\rangle$ a smooth family of normalized states depending on parameters $\boldsymbol{\lambda}=(\lambda^1,\dots,\lambda^N)$, with $\langle u|u\rangle=1$. Under a gauge transformation $|u\rangle \mapsto e^{i\phi(\boldsymbol{\lambda})}|u\rangle,$ physical predictions must be unchanged.

The quantum geometric tensor is the gauge-invariant bilinear form $T_{ij}(\boldsymbol{\lambda}) =\langle \partial_i u | (1-|u\rangle\langle u|) | \partial_j u\rangle =\langle \partial_i u | \partial_j u\rangle -\langle \partial_i u | u\rangle \langle u | \partial_j u\rangle,$ where $\partial_i\equiv \partial/\partial\lambda^i$.

Its real and imaginary parts define two standard gauge-invariant tensors: $g_{ij}=\mathrm{Re}\,T_{ij}\qquad\text{(quantum metric)},$ $\Omega_{ij}=2\,\mathrm{Im}\,T_{ij}\qquad\text{(Berry curvature; conventions vary)}.$

Different authors use different overall factors and sign conventions for the Berry connection/curvature and for the normalization of the metric. These differences do not affect gauge-invariant observables, which depend on convention-consistent combinations of geometric quantities.

=== Fidelity and distance ===
The quantum metric controls the leading decrease in the overlap (fidelity) between nearby quantum states: $1-\left|\langle u(\boldsymbol{\lambda})|u(\boldsymbol{\lambda}+d\boldsymbol{\lambda})\rangle\right|^2 = g_{ij}\,d\lambda^i d\lambda^j + O(|d\boldsymbol{\lambda}|^3).$

In many-body physics, the same structure (applied to the ground state $|\Psi(\boldsymbol{\lambda})\rangle$) is often discussed under the names fidelity susceptibility and information geometry of quantum phase transitions.

=== Berry connection and curvature ===
A common (gauge-dependent) definition of the Berry connection is $A_i(\boldsymbol{\lambda}) = i\langle u|\partial_i u\rangle,$ whose curl gives the (gauge-invariant) Berry curvature $\Omega_{ij}=\partial_i A_j-\partial_j A_i.$

Under $|u\rangle\mapsto e^{i\phi}|u\rangle$, the connection transforms as $A_i\mapsto A_i-\partial_i\phi$ while $\Omega_{ij}$ and $T_{ij}$ remain gauge invariant.

=== Projector form and relation to interband matrix elements ===
For an isolated normalized state, let $P=|u\rangle\langle u|$ be the rank-one projector. The quantum metric can be written in a manifestly gauge-invariant form $g_{ij}=\frac{1}{2}\,\mathrm{Tr}\left[(\partial_i P)(\partial_j P)\right],$ with related projector formulas for Berry curvature in terms of commutators of $P$ and its derivatives.

If $|u_n\rangle$ is a nondegenerate eigenstate of a Hamiltonian $H(\boldsymbol{\lambda})$, then the QGT can also be expressed as a sum over virtual transitions to other eigenstates $|u_m\rangle$: $T_{ij}^{(n)} =\sum_{m\neq n}\frac{\langle u_n|\partial_i H|u_m\rangle\,\langle u_m|\partial_j H|u_n\rangle}{(E_m-E_n)^2},$ making explicit that both the metric and curvature are controlled by interband matrix elements and energy gaps.

=== Illustrative example: two-level system ===
For a normalized two-level state (spin-$\tfrac{1}{2}$) parameterized by polar angles $(\theta,\phi)$,
$$|u(\theta,\phi)\rangle=
\begin{pmatrix}
\cos(\theta/2)\\
e^{i\phi}\sin(\theta/2)
\end{pmatrix},$$
the space of rays is the Bloch sphere. In these coordinates the quantum metric is the round metric (up to an overall factor) $ds^2=g_{\theta\theta}\,d\theta^2+g_{\phi\phi}\,d\phi^2 =\frac{1}{4}\left(d\theta^2+\sin^2\theta\,d\phi^2\right),$ and the Berry curvature is proportional to the sphere's area form, $\Omega_{\theta\phi}=\frac{1}{2}\sin\theta,$ illustrating how the metric measures state distinguishability while the curvature encodes geometric phase.

== Bloch-band quantum geometry ==
In a periodic crystal, single-particle eigenstates can be written as Bloch waves $|\psi_{n\mathbf{k}}\rangle = e^{i\mathbf{k}\cdot\mathbf{r}} |u_{n\mathbf{k}}\rangle,$ where $\mathbf{k}$ lies in the Brillouin zone and $|u_{n\mathbf{k}}\rangle$ is periodic in real space. Under a $\mathbf{k}$-dependent phase choice $|u_{n\mathbf{k}}\rangle\mapsto e^{i\phi_n(\mathbf{k})}|u_{n\mathbf{k}}\rangle$, physical observables must remain invariant.

For an isolated band $n$, the QGT over $\mathbf{k}$-space is $T^{(n)}_{ij}(\mathbf{k}) =\langle \partial_{k_i} u_{n\mathbf{k}} | (1-|u_{n\mathbf{k}}\rangle\langle u_{n\mathbf{k}}|) | \partial_{k_j} u_{n\mathbf{k}}\rangle,$ with quantum metric $g^{(n)}_{ij}(\mathbf{k})=\mathrm{Re}\,T^{(n)}_{ij}(\mathbf{k})$ and Berry curvature $\Omega^{(n)}_{ij}(\mathbf{k})=2\,\mathrm{Im}\,T^{(n)}_{ij}(\mathbf{k})$.

=== Topology ===
In two dimensions, integrating the Berry curvature of an isolated band over the Brillouin zone yields its (first) Chern number $C_n=\frac{1}{2\pi}\int_{\mathrm{BZ}}\Omega^{(n)}_{xy}(\mathbf{k})\,d^2k,$ which is an integer that controls quantized Hall responses in band insulators via the Thouless–Kohmoto–Nightingale–den Nijs (TKNN) theory of the quantum Hall effect.

In one dimension, Berry phases accumulated across the Brillouin zone are used to characterize band topology in systems with suitable symmetries (for example, through the Zak phase).

=== Berry curvature in semiclassical dynamics ===
In semiclassical wave-packet dynamics, Berry curvature acts as an effective momentum-space "magnetic field" that produces an anomalous velocity term. For a wave packet constructed from a single isolated band, $\dot{\mathbf{r}}=\frac{1}{\hbar}\nabla_{\mathbf{k}}\varepsilon_n(\mathbf{k})-\dot{\mathbf{k}}\times \boldsymbol{\Omega}_n(\mathbf{k}),$ where $\varepsilon_n(\mathbf{k})$ is the band dispersion and $\boldsymbol{\Omega}_n$ is the Berry curvature written as a vector in three dimensions (or pseudo-vector in two).

=== Quantum metric, localization, and Wannier functions ===
The quantum metric is closely tied to localization properties of Bloch bands. In band theory, the construction of localized Wannier functions involves a gauge choice of Bloch states across the Brillouin zone; the standard Wannier spread functional contains gauge-invariant contributions that can be expressed using the Brillouin-zone integral of the quantum metric.

Related many-body formulations connect cumulants of polarization and localization to derivatives of the ground state with respect to twists in boundary conditions (equivalently, flux insertion through a torus), providing a geometric interpretation of localization in insulators.

Topological obstructions to exponentially localized Wannier functions are linked to nonzero Chern numbers (and hence Berry curvature) in two dimensions.

=== Response functions and measurable consequences ===
Berry curvature and quantum metric can enter measurable response properties through their control of interband matrix elements and phase-space structure. Examples discussed in the literature include geometric contributions to transport and optical responses, equilibrium current noise, and superconducting stiffness in multiband systems.

=== Flat-band superconductivity and geometric superfluid weight ===
In multiband superconductors, the superfluid weight (superconducting stiffness) can have a geometric contribution expressible in terms of the quantum metric of the normal-state Bloch bands. In the flat-band limit, this geometric term can dominate within Bardeen–Cooper–Schrieffer (BCS) mean-field treatments, helping enable superfluidity even when band dispersion is small.

== Many-body and interacting systems ==
Quantum geometry generalizes beyond single-particle bands to interacting many-body states. Applying the quantum geometric tensor to a many-body ground state $|\Psi(\boldsymbol{\lambda})\rangle$ defines a gauge-invariant metric and curvature on the parameter manifold of Hamiltonians, and the resulting fidelity susceptibility has been widely used to diagnose quantum criticality and phase transitions.

In lattice systems on a torus, twisting boundary conditions (equivalently, inserting fluxes through the handles of the torus) provides a physically motivated parameter space. Derivatives with respect to these twists connect quantum geometry to polarization and localization diagnostics in insulators, and to geometric/topological characterization of many-body states.

== Multi-band and non-Abelian quantum geometry ==
When a set of bands forms a degenerate or nearly degenerate subspace (for example, due to symmetry), geometric quantities become non-Abelian because states within the subspace may mix under parallel transport. The appropriate gauge freedom is then a unitary transformation among a basis $\{|u_{a}\rangle\}$ spanning the subspace.

A common formulation introduces the (matrix-valued) non-Abelian Berry connection $(A_i)_{ab}=i\langle u_a|\partial_i u_b\rangle,$ and the corresponding curvature $(F_{ij})=\partial_i A_j-\partial_j A_i-i[A_i,A_j],$ which transforms covariantly under unitary changes of basis within the subspace.

Geometric distances for a subspace can be expressed using the projector $P=\sum_a |u_a\rangle\langle u_a|$ onto that subspace; the resulting projector-based quantum metric provides a gauge-invariant measure of how the subspace changes across parameter space and reduces to the usual single-state quantum metric when the subspace has rank one.

== Experimental probes ==
Protocols to access components of the quantum geometric tensor have been proposed and realized in multiple experimental platforms. Techniques include interferometric measurements of Berry phases/curvatures, wave-packet dynamics, and spectroscopy or periodic driving schemes that extract the quantum metric from excitation rates or transition probabilities.

Direct experimental measurements of both Berry curvature and quantum metric (i.e., the full QGT) have been reported, for example in exciton–polariton systems and in solid-state spin-qubit platforms.

== See also ==
- Berry phase
- Berry curvature
- Fubini–Study metric
- Projective Hilbert space
- Wannier function
- Chern number
