= Quantum =

Minimum amount of a physical entity involved in an interaction

In physics, a quantum (pl.: quanta) is the minimum amount of any physical entity (physical property) involved in an interaction. The fundamental notion that a property can be "quantized" is referred to as "the hypothesis of quantization". This means that the magnitude of the physical property can take on only discrete values consisting of integer multiples of one quantum. For example, a photon is a single quantum of light of a specific frequency (or of any other form of electromagnetic radiation). Similarly, the energy of an electron bound within an atom is quantized and can exist only in certain discrete values. Atoms and matter in general are stable because electrons can exist only at discrete energy levels within an atom. Quantization is one of the foundations of the much broader physics of quantum mechanics. Quantization of energy and its influence on how energy and matter interact (quantum electrodynamics) is part of the fundamental framework for understanding and describing nature.

== Origin ==
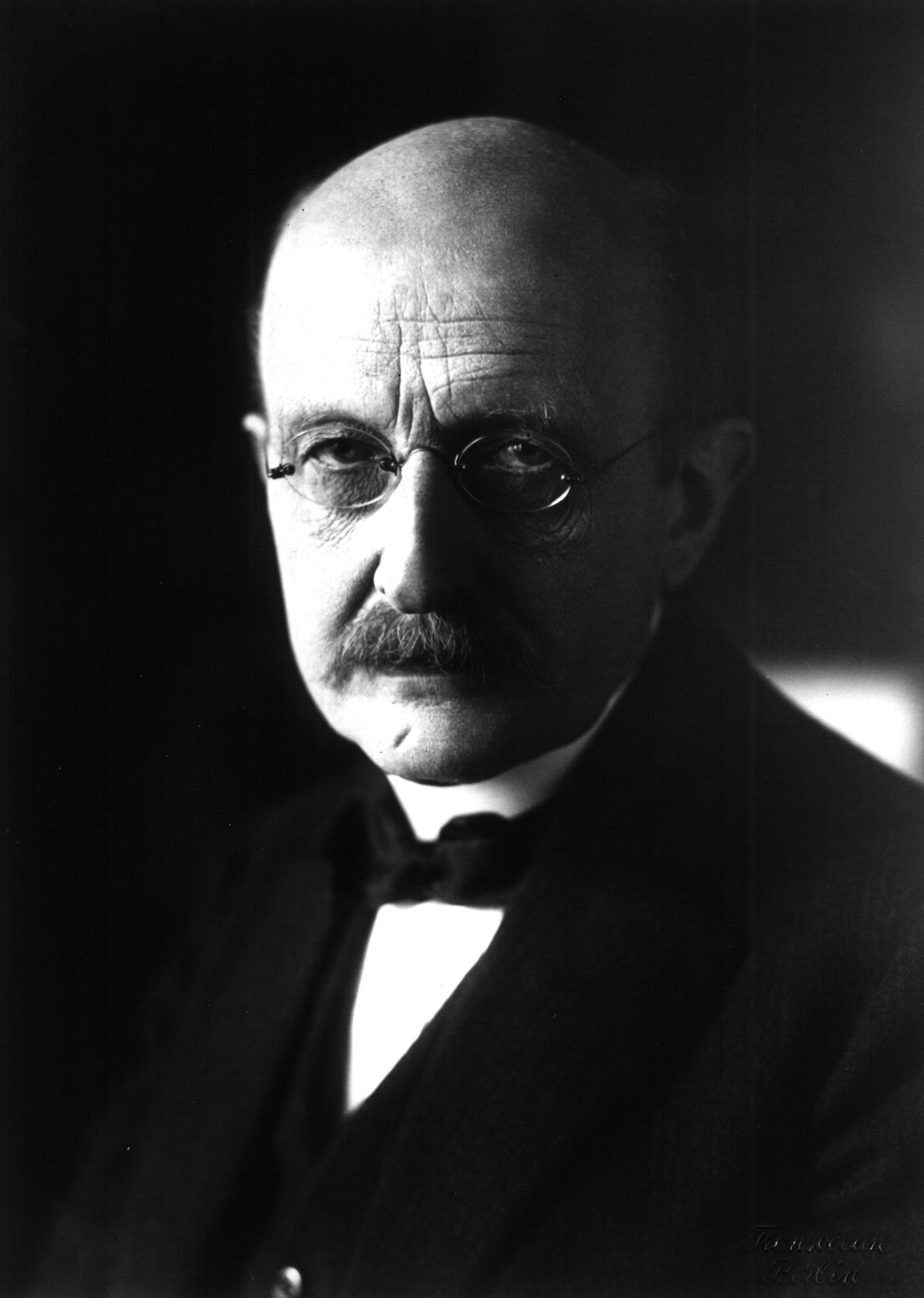
German physicist and 1918 Nobel Prize for Physics recipient Max Planck (1858–1947)

The modern concept of the quantum in physics originates from December 14, 1900, when Max Planck reported his findings to the German Physical Society. He showed that modelling harmonic oscillators with discrete energy levels resolved a longstanding problem in the theory of blackbody radiation. In his report, Planck did not use the term quantum in the modern sense. Instead, he used the term Elementarquantum to refer to the "quantum of electricity", now known as the elementary charge. For the smallest unit of energy, he employed the term Energieelement, "energy element", rather than calling it a quantum.

Shortly afterwards, in a paper published in Annalen der Physik, Planck introduced the constant h, which he termed the "quantum of action" (elementares Wirkungsquantum) in 1906. In this paper, Planck also reported more precise values for the elementary charge and the Avogadro–Loschmidt number, the number of molecules in one mole of substance. The constant h is now known as the Planck constant. After his theory was validated, Planck was awarded the Nobel Prize in Physics for his discovery in 1918.

In 1905 Albert Einstein suggested that electromagnetic radiation exists in spatially localized packets which he called "quanta of light" (Lichtquanta). Einstein was able to use this hypothesis to recast Planck's treatment of the blackbody problem in a form that also explained the voltages observed in Philipp Lenard's experiments on the photoelectric effect. Shortly thereafter, the term "energy quantum" was introduced for the quantity hν.

== Quantization ==
While quantization was first discovered in electromagnetic radiation, it describes a fundamental aspect of energy not just restricted to photons. In the attempt to bring theory into agreement with experiment, Max Planck postulated that electromagnetic energy is absorbed or emitted in discrete packets, or quanta.

== See also ==
- Introduction to quantum mechanics
- History of quantum mechanics
- Quantum geometry
