= Gauge theory =

Physical theory with fields invariant under the action of local "gauge" Lie groups

In physics, a gauge theory is a type of field theory in which the Lagrangian, and hence the dynamics of the system itself, does not change under local transformations according to certain smooth families of operations (Lie groups). Formally, the Lagrangian is invariant under these transformations.

The term "gauge" refers to any specific mathematical formalism to regulate redundant degrees of freedom in the Lagrangian of a physical system. The transformations between possible gauges, called gauge transformations, form a Lie group—referred to as the symmetry group or the gauge group of the theory. Associated with any Lie group is the Lie algebra of group generators. For each group generator there necessarily arises a corresponding field (usually a vector field) called the gauge field. Gauge fields are included in the Lagrangian to ensure its invariance under the local group transformations (called gauge invariance). When such a theory is quantized, the quanta of the gauge fields are called gauge bosons. If the symmetry group is non-commutative, then the gauge theory is referred to as non-abelian gauge theory, the usual example being the Yang–Mills theory.

Many powerful theories in physics are described by Lagrangians that are invariant under some symmetry transformation groups. When they are invariant under a transformation identically performed at every point in the spacetime in which the physical processes occur, they are said to have a global symmetry. Local symmetry, the cornerstone of gauge theories, is a stronger constraint. In fact, a global symmetry is just a local symmetry whose group's parameters are fixed in spacetime (the same way a constant value can be understood as a function of a certain parameter, the output of which is always the same).

Gauge theories are important as the successful field theories explaining the dynamics of elementary particles. Quantum electrodynamics is an abelian gauge theory with the symmetry group U(1) and has one gauge field, the electromagnetic four-potential, with the photon being the gauge boson. The Standard Model is a non-abelian gauge theory with the symmetry group U(1) × SU(2) × SU(3) and has a total of twelve gauge bosons: the photon, three weak bosons and eight gluons.

Gauge theories are also important in explaining gravitation in the theory of general relativity. Its case is somewhat unusual in that the gauge field is a tensor, the Lanczos tensor. Theories of quantum gravity, beginning with gauge gravitation theory, also postulate the existence of a gauge boson known as the graviton. Gauge symmetries can be viewed as analogues of the principle of general covariance of general relativity in which the coordinate system can be chosen freely under arbitrary diffeomorphisms of spacetime. Both gauge invariance and diffeomorphism invariance reflect a redundancy in the description of the system. An alternative theory of gravitation, gauge theory gravity, replaces the principle of general covariance with a true gauge principle with new gauge fields.

Historically, these ideas were first stated in the context of classical electromagnetism and later in general relativity. However, the modern importance of gauge symmetries appeared first in the relativistic quantum mechanics of electrons – quantum electrodynamics, elaborated-on below. Today, gauge theories are useful in condensed matter, nuclear and high energy physics among other subfields.

== History ==
The concept and the name of gauge theory derives from the work of Hermann Weyl in 1918. Weyl, in an attempt to generalize the geometrical ideas of general relativity to include electromagnetism, conjectured that Eichinvarianz or invariance under the change of scale might also be a local symmetry of general relativity. Weyl used the word "gauge" to describe this concept, after a Latin word referring to standard cask sizes, the same root as railroad gauge. After the development of quantum mechanics, Weyl, Vladimir Fock and Fritz London replaced the simple scale factor with a complex quantity and turned the scale transformation into a change of phase, which is a U(1) gauge symmetry. This explained the electromagnetic field effect on the wave function of a charged quantum mechanical particle. Weyl's 1929 paper introduced the modern concept of gauge invariance subsequently popularized by Wolfgang Pauli in his 1941 review. While gauge theory or gauge symmetry no longer means a scale change, the term gauge became widely adopted for the concept.

In retrospect, James Clerk Maxwell's formulation, in 1864–65, of electrodynamics in "A Dynamical Theory of the Electromagnetic Field" suggested the possibility of invariance, when he stated that any vector field whose curl vanishes—and can therefore normally be written as a gradient of a function—could be added to the vector potential without affecting the magnetic field. Similarly unnoticed, David Hilbert had derived the Einstein field equations by postulating the invariance of the action under a general coordinate transformation. The importance of these symmetry invariances remained unnoticed until Weyl's work.

Inspired by Pauli's descriptions of connection between charge conservation and field theory driven by invariance, Chen Ning Yang sought a field theory for atomic nuclei binding based on conservation of nuclear isospin. In 1954, Yang and Robert Mills generalized the gauge invariance of electromagnetism, constructing a theory based on the action of the (non-abelian) SU(2) symmetry group on the isospin doublet of protons and neutrons. This is similar to the action of the U(1) group on the spinor fields of quantum electrodynamics.

The Yang–Mills theory became the prototype theory to resolve some of the confusion in elementary particle physics. This idea later found application in the quantum field theory of the weak force, and its unification with electromagnetism in the electroweak theory. Gauge theories became even more attractive when it was realized that non-abelian gauge theories reproduced a feature called asymptotic freedom. Asymptotic freedom was believed to be an important characteristic of strong interactions. This motivated searching for a strong force gauge theory. This theory, now known as quantum chromodynamics, is a gauge theory with the action of the SU(3) group on the color triplet of quarks. The Standard Model unifies the description of electromagnetism, weak interactions and strong interactions in the language of gauge theory.

In the 1970s, Michael Atiyah began studying the mathematics of solutions to the classical Yang–Mills equations. In 1983, Atiyah's student Simon Donaldson built on this work to show that the differentiable classification of smooth 4-manifolds is very different from their classification up to homeomorphism. Michael Freedman used Donaldson's work to exhibit exotic R^{4}s, that is, exotic differentiable structures on Euclidean 4-dimensional space. This led to an increasing interest in gauge theory for its own sake, independent of its successes in fundamental physics. In 1994, Edward Witten and Nathan Seiberg invented gauge-theoretic techniques based on supersymmetry that enabled the calculation of certain topological invariants (the Seiberg–Witten invariants). These contributions to mathematics from gauge theory have led to a renewed interest in this area.

The importance of gauge theories in physics is exemplified in the success of the mathematical formalism in providing a unified framework to describe the quantum field theories of electromagnetism, the weak force and the strong force. This theory, known as the Standard Model, accurately describes experimental predictions regarding three of the four fundamental forces of nature, and is a gauge theory with the gauge group SU(3) × SU(2) × U(1). Modern theories like string theory, as well as general relativity, are, in one way or another, gauge theories.

See Jackson and Okun for early history of gauge and Pickering for more about the history of gauge and quantum field theories.

== Description ==
=== Global and local symmetries ===
==== Global symmetry ====
In physics, the mathematical description of any physical situation usually contains excess degrees of freedom; the same physical situation is equally well described by many equivalent mathematical configurations. For instance, in Newtonian dynamics, if two configurations are related by a Galilean transformation (an inertial change of reference frame) they represent the same physical situation. These transformations form a group of "symmetries" (in mathematical terms, "automorphisms") of the theory, and a physical situation corresponds not to an individual mathematical configuration but to a class of configurations related to one another by this symmetry group (i.e. an orbit of configurations under the action of the automorphism group).

This idea can be generalized to include local as well as global symmetries, analogous to much more abstract "changes of coordinates" in a situation where there is no preferred "inertial" coordinate system that covers the entire physical system. A gauge theory is a mathematical model that has symmetries of this kind, together with a set of techniques for making physical predictions consistent with the symmetries of the model.

==== Example of global symmetry ====
When a quantity occurring in the mathematical configuration is not just a number but has some geometrical significance, such as a velocity or an axis of rotation, its representation as numbers arranged in a vector or matrix is also changed by a coordinate transformation. For instance, if one description of a pattern of fluid flow states that the fluid velocity in the neighborhood of (x = 1, y = 0) is 1 m/s in the positive x direction, then a description of the same situation in which the coordinate system has been rotated clockwise by 90 degrees states that the fluid velocity in the neighborhood of (x = 0, y = −1) is 1 m/s in the negative y direction. The coordinate transformation has affected both the coordinate system used to identify the location of the measurement and the basis in which its value is expressed. As long as this transformation is performed globally (affecting the coordinate basis in the same way at every point), the effect on values that represent the rate of change of some quantity along some path in space and time as it passes through point P is the same as the effect on values that are truly local to P.

==== Local symmetry ====
===== Use of fiber bundles to describe local symmetries =====
In order to adequately describe physical situations in more complex theories, it is often necessary to introduce a "coordinate basis" for some of the objects of the theory that do not have this simple relationship to the coordinates used to label points in space and time. (In mathematical terms, the theory involves a fiber bundle in which the fiber at each point of the base space consists of possible coordinate bases for use when describing the values of objects at that point.) In order to spell out a mathematical configuration, one must choose a particular coordinate basis at each point (a local section of the fiber bundle) and express the values of the objects of the theory (usually "fields" in the physicist's sense) using this basis. Two such mathematical configurations are equivalent (describe the same physical situation) if they are related by a transformation of this abstract coordinate basis (a change of local section, or gauge transformation).

In most gauge theories, the set of possible transformations of the abstract gauge basis at an individual point in space and time is a finite-dimensional Lie group. The simplest such group is U(1), which appears in the modern formulation of quantum electrodynamics (QED) via its use of complex numbers. QED is generally regarded as the first, and simplest, physical gauge theory. The set of possible gauge transformations of the entire configuration of a given gauge theory also forms a group, the gauge group of the theory. An element of the gauge group can be parameterized by a smoothly varying function from the points of spacetime to the (finite-dimensional) Lie group, such that the value of the function and its derivatives at each point represents the action of the gauge transformation on the fiber over that point.

A gauge transformation with constant parameter at every point in space and time is analogous to a rigid rotation of the geometric coordinate system; it represents a global symmetry of the gauge representation. As in the case of a rigid rotation, this gauge transformation affects expressions that represent the rate of change along a path of some gauge-dependent quantity in the same way as those that represent a truly local quantity. A gauge transformation whose parameter is not a constant function is referred to as a local symmetry; its effect on expressions that involve a derivative is qualitatively different from that on expressions that do not. (This is analogous to a non-inertial change of reference frame, which can produce a Coriolis effect.)

=== Gauge fields ===
The "gauge covariant" version of a gauge theory accounts for this effect by introducing a gauge field (in mathematical language, an Ehresmann connection) and formulating all rates of change in terms of the covariant derivative with respect to this connection. The gauge field becomes an essential part of the description of a mathematical configuration. A configuration in which the gauge field can be eliminated by a gauge transformation has the property that its field strength (in mathematical language, its curvature) is zero everywhere; a gauge theory is not limited to these configurations. In other words, the distinguishing characteristic of a gauge theory is that the gauge field does not merely compensate for a poor choice of coordinate system; there is generally no gauge transformation that makes the gauge field vanish.

When analyzing the dynamics of a gauge theory, the gauge field must be treated as a dynamical variable, similar to other objects in the description of a physical situation. In addition to its interaction with other objects via the covariant derivative, the gauge field typically contributes energy in the form of a "self-energy" term. One can obtain the equations for the gauge theory by:

- starting from a naïve ansatz without the gauge field (in which the derivatives appear in a "bare" form);
- listing those global symmetries of the theory that can be characterized by a continuous parameter (generally an abstract equivalent of a rotation angle);
- computing the correction terms that result from allowing the symmetry parameter to vary from place to place; and
- reinterpreting these correction terms as couplings to one or more gauge fields, and giving these fields appropriate self-energy terms and dynamical behavior.

This is the sense in which a gauge theory "extends" a global symmetry to a local symmetry, and closely resembles the historical development of the gauge theory of gravity known as general relativity.

=== Physical experiments ===
Gauge theories used to model the results of physical experiments engage in:

- limiting the universe of possible configurations to those consistent with the information used to set up the experiment, and then
- computing the probability distribution of the possible outcomes that the experiment is designed to measure.

We cannot express the mathematical descriptions of the "setup information" and the "possible measurement outcomes", or the "boundary conditions" of the experiment, without reference to a particular coordinate system, including a choice of gauge. One assumes an adequate experiment isolated from "external" influence that is itself a gauge-dependent statement. Mishandling gauge dependence calculations in boundary conditions is a frequent source of anomalies, and approaches to anomaly avoidance classifies gauge theories.

=== Continuum theories ===
The two gauge theories mentioned above, continuum electrodynamics and general relativity, are continuum field theories. The techniques of calculation in a continuum theory implicitly assume that:

- given a completely fixed choice of gauge, the boundary conditions of an individual configuration are completely described
- given a completely fixed gauge and a complete set of boundary conditions, the least action determines a unique mathematical configuration and therefore a unique physical situation consistent with these bounds
- fixing the gauge introduces no anomalies in the calculation, due either to gauge dependence in describing partial information about boundary conditions or to incompleteness of the theory.

Determination of the likelihood of possible measurement outcomes proceed by:

- establishing a probability distribution over all physical situations determined by boundary conditions consistent with the setup information
- establishing a probability distribution of measurement outcomes for each possible physical situation
- convolving these two probability distributions to get a distribution of possible measurement outcomes consistent with the setup information

These assumptions have enough validity across a wide range of energy scales and experimental conditions to allow these theories to make accurate predictions about almost all of the phenomena encountered in daily life: light, heat, and electricity, eclipses, spaceflight, etc. They fail only at the smallest and largest scales due to omissions in the theories themselves, and when the mathematical techniques themselves break down, most notably in the case of turbulence and other chaotic phenomena.

=== Quantum field theories ===
Other than these classical continuum field theories, the most widely known gauge theories are quantum field theories, including quantum electrodynamics and the Standard Model of elementary particle physics. The starting point of a quantum field theory is much like that of its continuum analog: a gauge-covariant action integral that characterizes "allowable" physical situations according to the principle of least action. However, continuum and quantum theories differ significantly in how they handle the excess degrees of freedom represented by gauge transformations. Continuum theories, and most pedagogical treatments of the simplest quantum field theories, use a gauge fixing prescription to reduce the orbit of mathematical configurations that represent a given physical situation to a smaller orbit related by a smaller gauge group (the global symmetry group, or perhaps even the trivial group).

More sophisticated quantum field theories, in particular those that involve a non-abelian gauge group, break the gauge symmetry within the techniques of perturbation theory by introducing additional fields (the Faddeev–Popov ghosts) and counterterms motivated by anomaly cancellation, in an approach known as BRST quantization. While these concerns are in one sense highly technical, they are also closely related to the nature of measurement, the limits on knowledge of a physical situation, and the interactions between incompletely specified experimental conditions and incompletely understood physical theory. The mathematical techniques that have been developed in order to make gauge theories tractable have found many other applications, from solid-state physics and crystallography to low-dimensional topology.

== Classical gauge theory ==
=== Classical electromagnetism ===
In electrostatics, one can either discuss the electric field, E, or its corresponding electric potential, V. Knowledge of one makes it possible to find the other, except that potentials differing by a constant, $V \mapsto V+C$, correspond to the same electric field. This is because the electric field relates to changes in the potential from one point in space to another, and the constant C would cancel out when subtracting to find the change in potential. In terms of vector calculus, the electric field is the gradient of the potential, $\mathbf{E} = -\nabla V$. Generalizing from static electricity to electromagnetism, we have a second potential, the vector potential A, with

$$\begin{align}
\mathbf{E} &= -\nabla V - \frac{\partial \mathbf{A}}{\partial t}\\
\mathbf{B} &=  \nabla \times \mathbf{A}
\end{align}$$

The general gauge transformations now become not just $V \mapsto V+C$ but

$$\begin{align}
\mathbf{A} &\mapsto \mathbf{A} + \nabla f\\
V &\mapsto V - \frac{\partial f}{\partial t}
\end{align}$$

where f is any twice continuously differentiable function that depends on position and time. The electromagnetic fields remain the same under the gauge transformation.

=== Example: scalar O(n) gauge theory ===
The remainder of this section requires some familiarity with classical or quantum field theory, and the use of Lagrangians.
Definitions in this section: gauge group, gauge field, interaction Lagrangian, gauge boson.

The following illustrates how local gauge invariance can be "motivated" heuristically starting from global symmetry properties, and how it leads to an interaction between originally non-interacting fields.

Consider a set of $n$ non-interacting real scalar fields, with equal masses m. This system is described by an action that is the sum of the (usual) action for each scalar field $\varphi_i$

$$\mathcal{S} = \int \, \mathrm{d}^4 x \sum_{i=1}^n \left[ \frac{1}{2} \partial_\mu \varphi_i \partial^\mu \varphi_i - \frac{1}{2}m^2 \varphi_i^2 \right]$$

The Lagrangian (density) can be compactly written as

$$\ \mathcal{L} = \frac{1}{2} (\partial_\mu \Phi)^\mathsf{T} \partial^\mu \Phi - \frac{1}{2}m^2 \Phi^\mathsf{T} \Phi$$

by introducing a vector of fields

$$\ \Phi^\mathsf{T} = ( \varphi_1, \varphi_2,\ldots, \varphi_n)$$

The term $\partial_\mu\Phi$ is the partial derivative of $\Phi$ along dimension $\mu$.

It is now transparent that the Lagrangian is invariant under the transformation

$$\ \Phi \mapsto \Phi' = G \Phi$$

whenever G is a constant matrix belonging to the n-by-n orthogonal group O(n). This is seen to preserve the Lagrangian, since the derivative of $\Phi'$ transforms identically to $\Phi$ and both quantities appear inside dot products in the Lagrangian (orthogonal transformations preserve the dot product).

$$\ (\partial_\mu \Phi) \mapsto (\partial_\mu \Phi)' = G \partial_\mu \Phi$$

This characterizes the global symmetry of this particular Lagrangian, and the symmetry group is often called the gauge group; the mathematical term is structure group, especially in the theory of G-structures. Incidentally, Noether's theorem implies that invariance under this group of transformations leads to the conservation of the currents

$$\ J^{a}_{\mu} = i\partial_\mu \Phi^\mathsf{T} T^{a} \Phi$$

where the T^{a} matrices are generators of the SO(n) group. There is one conserved current for every generator.

Now, demanding that this Lagrangian should have local O(n)-invariance requires that the G matrices (which were earlier constant) should be allowed to become functions of the spacetime coordinates x.

In this case, the G matrices do not "pass through" the derivatives, when G = G(x),

$$\ \partial_\mu (G \Phi) \neq G (\partial_\mu \Phi)$$

The failure of the derivative to commute with "G" introduces an additional term (in keeping with the product rule), which spoils the invariance of the Lagrangian. In order to rectify this we define a new derivative operator such that the derivative of $\Phi'$ again transforms identically with $\Phi$

$$\ (D_\mu \Phi)' = G D_\mu \Phi$$

This new "derivative" is called a (gauge) covariant derivative and takes the form

$$\ D_\mu = \partial_\mu - i g A_\mu$$

where g is called the coupling constant; a quantity defining the strength of an interaction. After a simple calculation we can see that the gauge field A(x) must transform as follows

$$\ A'_\mu = G A_\mu G^{-1} - \frac{i}{g} (\partial_\mu G)G^{-1}$$

The gauge field is an element of the Lie algebra, and can therefore be expanded as

$$\ A_{\mu} =  \sum_a A_{\mu}^a T^a$$

There are therefore as many gauge fields as there are generators of the Lie algebra.

Finally, we now have a locally gauge invariant Lagrangian

$$\ \mathcal{L}_\mathrm{loc} = \frac{1}{2} (D_\mu \Phi)^\mathsf{T} D^\mu \Phi -\frac{1}{2}m^2 \Phi^\mathsf{T} \Phi$$

Pauli uses the term gauge transformation of the first type to mean the transformation of $\Phi$, while the compensating transformation in $A$ is called a gauge transformation of the second type.

Feynman diagram of scalar bosons interacting via a gauge boson

The difference between this Lagrangian and the original globally gauge-invariant Lagrangian is seen to be the interaction Lagrangian

$$\ \mathcal{L}_\mathrm{int} = i\frac{g}{2} \Phi^\mathsf{T} A_{\mu}^\mathsf{T} \partial^\mu \Phi + i\frac{g}{2}  (\partial_\mu \Phi)^\mathsf{T} A^{\mu} \Phi - \frac{g^2}{2} (A_\mu \Phi)^\mathsf{T} A^\mu \Phi$$

This term introduces interactions between the n scalar fields just as a consequence of the demand for local gauge invariance. However, to make this interaction physical and not completely arbitrary, the mediator A(x) needs to propagate in space. That is dealt with in the next section by adding yet another term, $\mathcal{L}_{\mathrm{gf}}$, to the Lagrangian. In the quantized version of the obtained classical field theory, the quanta of the gauge field A(x) are called gauge bosons. The interpretation of the interaction Lagrangian in quantum field theory is of scalar bosons interacting by the exchange of these gauge bosons.

=== Yang–Mills Lagrangian for the gauge field ===
The picture of a classical gauge theory developed in the previous section is almost complete, except for the fact that to define the covariant derivatives D, one needs to know the value of the gauge field $A(x)$ at all spacetime points. Instead of manually specifying the values of this field, it can be given as the solution to a field equation. Further requiring that the Lagrangian that generates this field equation is locally gauge invariant as well, one possible form for the gauge field Lagrangian is

$$\mathcal{L}_\text{gf} = -\frac{1}{2} \operatorname{tr}\left(F^{\mu \nu} F_{\mu \nu}\right) = -\frac{1}{4} F^{a \mu \nu} F^a_{\mu \nu}$$

where the $F^a_{\mu \nu}$ are obtained from potentials $A^a_\mu$, being the components of $A(x)$, by

$$F_{\mu \nu}^a = \partial_\mu A_\nu^a - \partial_\nu A_\mu^a + g\sum_{b,c} f^{abc} A_\mu^b A_\nu^c$$

and the $f^{abc}$ are the structure constants of the Lie algebra of the generators of the gauge group. This formulation of the Lagrangian is called a Yang–Mills action. Other gauge invariant actions also exist (e.g., nonlinear electrodynamics, Born–Infeld action, Chern–Simons model, theta term, etc.).

In this Lagrangian term there is no field whose transformation counterweighs the one of $A$. Invariance of this term under gauge transformations is a particular case of a priori classical (geometrical) symmetry. This symmetry must be restricted in order to perform quantization, the procedure being denominated gauge fixing, but even after restriction, gauge transformations may be possible.

The complete Lagrangian for the gauge theory is now

$$\mathcal{L} = \mathcal{L}_\text{loc} + \mathcal{L}_\text{gf} = \mathcal{L}_\text{global} + \mathcal{L}_\text{int} + \mathcal{L}_\text{gf}$$

=== Example: electrodynamics ===
As a simple application of the formalism developed in the previous sections, consider the case of electrodynamics, with only the electron field. The bare-bones action that generates the electron field's Dirac equation is

$$\mathcal{S} = \int \bar{\psi}\left(i \hbar c \, \gamma^\mu \partial_\mu - mc^2\right) \psi \, \mathrm{d}^4 x$$

The global symmetry for this system is

$$\psi \mapsto e^{i \theta} \psi$$

The gauge group here is U(1), just rotations of the phase angle of the field, with the particular rotation determined by the constant θ.

"Localising" this symmetry implies the replacement of θ by θ(x). An appropriate covariant derivative is then

$$D_\mu = \partial_\mu - i \frac{e}{\hbar} A_\mu$$

Identifying the "charge" e (not to be confused with the mathematical constant e in the symmetry description) with the usual electric charge (this is the origin of the usage of the term in gauge theories), and the gauge field A(x) with the four-vector potential of the electromagnetic field results in an interaction Lagrangian

$$\mathcal{L}_\text{int} = \frac{e}{\hbar}\bar{\psi}(x) \gamma^\mu \psi(x) A_\mu(x) = J^\mu(x) A_\mu(x)$$

where $J^\mu(x) = \frac{e}{\hbar}\bar{\psi}(x) \gamma^\mu \psi(x)$ is the electric current four vector in the Dirac field. The gauge principle is therefore seen to naturally introduce the so-called minimal coupling of the electromagnetic field to the electron field.

Adding a Lagrangian for the gauge field $A_\mu(x)$ in terms of the field strength tensor exactly as in electrodynamics, one obtains the Lagrangian used as the starting point in quantum electrodynamics.

$$\mathcal{L}_\text{QED} = \bar{\psi}\left(i\hbar c \, \gamma^\mu D_\mu - mc^2\right)\psi - \frac{1}{4 \mu_0}F_{\mu\nu}F^{\mu\nu}$$

== Mathematical formalism ==
Gauge theories are usually discussed in the language of differential geometry. Mathematically, a gauge is just a choice of a (local) section of some principal bundle. A gauge transformation is just a transformation between two such sections.

Although gauge theory is dominated by the study of connections (primarily because it's mainly studied by high-energy physicists), the idea of a connection is not central to gauge theory in general. In fact, a result in general gauge theory shows that affine representations (i.e., affine modules) of the gauge transformations can be classified as sections of a jet bundle satisfying certain properties. There are representations that transform covariantly pointwise (called by physicists gauge transformations of the first kind), representations that transform as a connection form (called by physicists gauge transformations of the second kind, an affine representation)—and other more general representations, such as the B field in BF theory. There are more general nonlinear representations (realizations), but these are extremely complicated. Still, nonlinear sigma models transform nonlinearly, so there are applications.

If there is a principal bundle P whose base space is space or spacetime and structure group is a Lie group, then the sections of P form a principal homogeneous space of the group of gauge transformations.

Connections (gauge connection) define this principal bundle, yielding a covariant derivative ∇ in each associated vector bundle. If a local frame is chosen (a local basis of sections), then this covariant derivative is represented by the connection form A, a Lie algebra-valued 1-form, which is called the gauge potential in physics. This is evidently not an intrinsic but a frame-dependent quantity. The curvature form F, a Lie algebra-valued 2-form that is an intrinsic quantity, is constructed from a connection form by

$$\mathbf{F} = \mathrm{d}\mathbf{A} + \mathbf{A}\wedge\mathbf{A}$$

where d stands for the exterior derivative and $\wedge$ stands for the wedge product. ($\mathbf{A}$ is an element of the vector space spanned by the generators $T^{a}$, and so the components of $\mathbf{A}$ do not commute with one another. Hence the wedge product $\mathbf{A}\wedge\mathbf{A}$ does not vanish.)

Infinitesimal gauge transformations form a Lie algebra, which is characterized by a smooth Lie-algebra-valued scalar, ε. Under such an infinitesimal gauge transformation,

$$\delta_\varepsilon \mathbf{A} = [\varepsilon,\mathbf{A}] - \mathrm{d}\varepsilon$$

where $[\cdot,\cdot]$ is the Lie bracket.

One nice thing is that if $\delta_\varepsilon X = \varepsilon X$, then $\delta_\varepsilon DX = \varepsilon DX$ where D is the covariant derivative

$$DX\ \stackrel{\mathrm{def}}{=}\ \mathrm{d}X + \mathbf{A}X$$

Also, $\delta_\varepsilon \mathbf{F} = [\varepsilon, \mathbf{F}]$, which means $\mathbf{F}$ transforms covariantly.

Not all gauge transformations can be generated by infinitesimal gauge transformations in general. An example is when the base manifold is a compact manifold without boundary such that the homotopy class of mappings from that manifold to the Lie group is nontrivial. See instanton for an example.

The Yang–Mills action is now given by

$$\frac{1}{4g^2}\int \operatorname{Tr}[{\star}F \wedge F]$$

where ${\star}$ is the Hodge star operator and the integral is defined as in differential geometry.

A quantity which is gauge-invariant (i.e., invariant under gauge transformations) is the Wilson loop, which is defined over any closed path, γ, as follows:

$$\chi^{(\rho)}\left(\mathcal{P}\left\{e^{\int_\gamma A}\right\}\right)$$

where χ is the character of a complex representation ρ and $\mathcal{P}$ represents the path-ordered operator.

The formalism of gauge theory carries over to a general setting. For example, it is sufficient to ask that a vector bundle have a metric connection; when one does so, one finds that the metric connection satisfies the Yang–Mills equations of motion.

== Quantization of gauge theories ==
Gauge theories may be quantized by specialization of methods which are applicable to any quantum field theory. However, because of the subtleties imposed by the gauge constraints (see section on Mathematical formalism, above) there are many technical problems to be solved which do not arise in other field theories. At the same time, the richer structure of gauge theories allows simplification of some computations: for example Ward identities connect different renormalization constants.

=== Methods and aims ===
The first gauge theory quantized was quantum electrodynamics (QED). The first methods developed for this involved gauge fixing and then applying canonical quantization. The Gupta–Bleuler method was also developed to handle this problem. Non-abelian gauge theories are now handled by a variety of means. Methods for quantization are covered in the article on quantization.

The main point to quantization is to be able to compute quantum amplitudes for various processes allowed by the theory. Technically, they reduce to the computations of certain correlation functions in the vacuum state. This involves a renormalization of the theory.

When the running coupling of the theory is small enough, then all required quantities may be computed in perturbation theory. Quantization schemes intended to simplify such computations (such as canonical quantization) may be called perturbative quantization schemes. At present some of these methods lead to the most precise experimental tests of gauge theories.

However, in most gauge theories, there are many interesting questions which are non-perturbative. Quantization schemes suited to these problems (such as lattice gauge theory) may be called non-perturbative quantization schemes. Precise computations in such schemes often require supercomputing, and are therefore less well-developed currently than other schemes.

=== Anomalies ===
Some of the symmetries of the classical theory are then seen not to hold in the quantum theory; a phenomenon called an anomaly. Among the most well known are:

- The scale anomaly, which gives rise to a running coupling constant. In QED this gives rise to the phenomenon of the Landau pole. In quantum chromodynamics (QCD) this leads to asymptotic freedom.
- The chiral anomaly in either chiral or vector field theories with fermions. This has close connection with topology through the notion of instantons. In QCD this anomaly causes the decay of a pion to two photons.
- The gauge anomaly, which must cancel in any consistent physical theory. In the electroweak theory this cancellation requires an equal number of quarks and leptons.

== Pure gauge ==
A pure gauge is the set of field configurations obtained by a gauge transformation on the null-field configuration, i.e., a gauge transform of zero. So it is a particular "gauge orbit" in the field configuration's space.

Thus, in the abelian case, where $A_\mu (x) \rightarrow A'_\mu(x) = A_\mu(x)+ \partial_\mu f(x)$, the pure gauge is just the set of field configurations $A'_\mu(x) = \partial_\mu f(x)$ for all f(x).

== See also ==
- 1964 PRL symmetry breaking papers
- Aharonov–Bohm effect
- Charge (physics)
- Coulomb gauge
- Electromagnetic four-potential
- Electromagnetic tensor
- Electroweak theory
- Fock symmetry
- Gauge covariant derivative
- Gauge fixing
- Gauge gravitation theory
- Gauge group (mathematics)
- Gauge principle
- Gauge theory (mathematics)
- Gluon field
- Gluon field strength tensor
- Kaluza–Klein theory
- Lorenz gauge
- Quantum chromodynamics
- Quantum electrodynamics
- Quantum field theory
- Standard Model
- Standard Model (mathematical formulation)
- Symmetry breaking
- Symmetry in physics
- Symmetry in quantum mechanics
- Ward identities
- Yang–Mills existence and mass gap
- Yang–Mills theory

== Bibliography ==
General readers

- Schumm, Bruce (2004) Deep Down Things. Johns Hopkins University Press. Esp. chpt. 8. A serious attempt by a physicist to explain gauge theory and the Standard Model with little formal mathematics.
- Carroll, Sean (2024). The Biggest Ideas in the Universe : Quanta and Fields. Dutton. p. 193-234 (chap 9 : Gauge Theory, and chap 10 : Phases). ISBN 978-0-5931-8660-2.

Texts

- Bailin, David; Love, Alexander (2019). Introduction to Gauge Field Theory. Taylor & Francis. doi:10.1201/9780203750100. ISBN 9780203750100.
- Cabibbo, Nicola; Maiani, Luciano; Benhar, Omar (2025). An Introduction to Gauge Theories. CRC Press. doi:10.1201/9781003560708. ISBN 9781003560708.
- Frampton, P. (2008). Gauge Field Theories (3rd ed.). Wiley-VCH.
- Kane, G.L. (1987). Modern Elementary Particle Physics. Perseus Books. ISBN 0-201-11749-5.
- Quigg, Chris (1983). Gauge Theories of the Strong, Weak and Electromagnetic Interactions. Addison-Wesley. ISBN 0-8053-6021-2.

Articles

- Becchi, C. (1997). "Introduction to Gauge Theories". arXiv:hep-ph/9705211.
- Gross, D. (1992). "Gauge theory – Past, Present and Future". Archived from the original on 2016-02-23.
- Jackson, J.D. (2002). "From Lorenz to Coulomb and other explicit gauge transformations". Am. J. Phys. 70 (9): 917–928. arXiv:physics/0204034. Bibcode:2002AmJPh..70..917J. doi:10.1119/1.1491265. S2CID 119652556.
- Svetlichny, George (1999). "Preparation for Gauge Theory". arXiv:math-ph/9902027.
