= Robert G. Chambers =

British physicist (1924–2016)

Robert Guy Chambers (1924 – 17 December 2016) was a British physicist. He won the 1994 Hughes Medal of the Royal Society "for his many contributions to solid-state physics, in particular his ingenious and technically demanding experiment which verified the Aharonov–Bohm effect concerning the behaviour of charged particles in magnetic fields"
