= Gauge principle =

Principle in physics

In physics, a gauge principle specifies a procedure for obtaining an interaction term from a free Lagrangian which is symmetric with respect to a continuous symmetry—the results of localizing (or gauging) the global symmetry group must be accompanied by the inclusion of additional fields (such as the electromagnetic field), with appropriate kinetic and interaction terms in the action, in such a way that the extended Lagrangian is covariant with respect to a new extended group of local transformations.

== See also ==
- Gauge theory
- Gauge covariant derivative
- Gauge fixing
- Gauge gravitation theory
- Kaluza–Klein theory
- Lie algebra
- Lie group
- Lorenz gauge
- Quantum chromodynamics
- Quantum electrodynamics
- Quantum field theory
- Quantum gauge theory
- Standard Model
- Standard Model (mathematical formulation)
- Symmetry breaking
- Symmetry in physics
- Yang–Mills theory
- Yang–Mills existence and mass gap
- 1964 PRL symmetry breaking papers
