= Hannay angle =

Mechanics analogue of the geometric phase

In classical mechanics, the Hannay angle is a mechanics analogue of the geometric phase (or Berry phase). It was named after John Hannay of the University of Bristol, UK. Hannay first described the angle in 1985, extending the ideas of the recently formalized Berry phase to classical mechanics.

Consider a one-dimensional system moving in a cycle, like a pendulum. Now slowly vary a slow parameter $\lambda$, like pulling and pushing on the string of a pendulum. We can picture the motion of the system as having a fast oscillation and a slow oscillation. The fast oscillation is the motion of the pendulum, and the slow oscillation is the motion of our pulling on its string. If we picture the system in phase space, its motion sweeps out a torus.

The adiabatic theorem in classical mechanics states that the action variable, which corresponds to the phase space area enclosed by the system's orbit, remains approximately constant. Thus, after one slow oscillation period, the fast oscillation is back to the same cycle, but its phase on the cycle has changed during the time. The phase change has two leading orders.

The first order is the "dynamical angle", which is simply $\int_0^T \omega(\lambda) dt$. This angle depends on the precise details of the motion, and it is of order $O(T)$.

The second order is Hannay's angle, which surprisingly is independent of the precise details of $\dot \lambda$. It depends on the trajectory of $\lambda$, but not how fast or slow it traverses the trajectory. It is of order $O(1)$.

== Hamiltonian mechanics ==
The Hannay angle is defined in the context of action-angle coordinates. In an initially time-invariant system, an action variable $I_\alpha$ is a constant. After introducing a periodic perturbation $\lambda(t)$, the action variable $I_\alpha$ becomes an adiabatic invariant, and the Hannay angle $\theta^H_\alpha$ for its corresponding angle variable can be calculated according to the path integral that represents an evolution in which the perturbation $\lambda(t)$ gets back to the original value
$$\theta^H_\alpha = -\frac{\partial}{\partial I_\alpha}\oint\!\boldsymbol{p} \cdot \frac{\partial \boldsymbol{q}}{\partial \lambda}\mathrm{d}\lambda = -\partial_{I_\alpha} \iint \omega$$
where $\boldsymbol{p}$ and $\boldsymbol{q}$ are canonical variables of the Hamiltonian, and $\omega$ is the symplectic Hamiltonian 2-form.

== Example ==
=== Foucault pendulum ===
The Foucault pendulum is an example from classical mechanics that is sometimes also used to illustrate the Berry phase. Below we study the Foucault pendulum using action-angle variables. For simplicity, we will avoid using the Hamilton–Jacobi equation, which is employed in the general protocol.

We consider a plane pendulum with frequency $\omega$ under the effect of Earth's rotation whose angular velocity is $\vec{\Omega}=(\Omega_x,\Omega_y,\Omega_z)$ with amplitude denoted as $\Omega=|\vec{\Omega}|$. Here, the $z$ direction points from the center of the Earth to the pendulum. The Lagrangian for the pendulum is
$$L=\frac{1}{2}m(\dot{x}^2+\dot{y}^2)-\frac{1}{2}m\omega^2(x^2+y^2)+m\Omega_z(x\dot{y}-y\dot{x})$$
The corresponding motion equation is
$$\ddot{x}+\omega^2x=2\Omega_z\dot{y}$$
$$\ddot{y}+\omega^2y=-2\Omega_z\dot{x}$$
We then introduce an auxiliary variable $\varpi=x+iy$ that is in fact an angle variable. We now have an equation for $\varpi$:
$$\ddot{\varpi}+\omega^2\varpi=-2i\Omega_z\dot{\varpi}$$
From its characteristic equation
$$\lambda^2+\omega^2=-2i\Omega_z\lambda$$
we obtain its characteristic root (we note that $\Omega \ll \omega$)
$$\lambda=-i\Omega_z\pm i\sqrt{\Omega_z^2+\omega^2}\approx-i\Omega_z\pm i\omega$$
The solution is then
$$\varpi=e^{-i\Omega_zt}(Ae^{i\omega t}+Be^{-i\omega t})$$
After the Earth rotates one full rotation that is $T=2\pi/\Omega\approx 24h$, we have the phase change for $\varpi$
$$\Delta \varphi=2\pi\frac{\omega}{\Omega}+2\pi\frac{\Omega_z}{\Omega}$$
The first term is due to dynamic effect of the pendulum and is termed as the dynamic phase, while the second term representing a geometric phase that is essentially the Hannay angle
$$\theta^H=2\pi\frac{\Omega_z}{\Omega}$$

=== Rotation of a rigid body ===
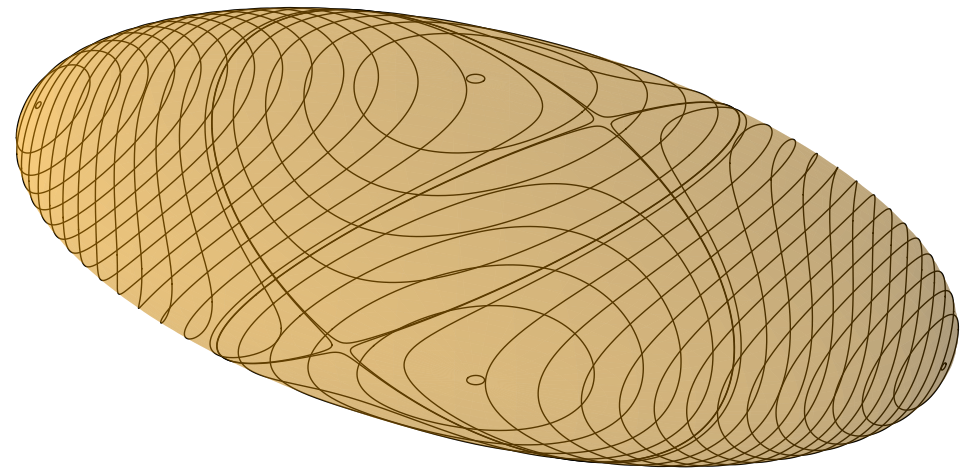
In the rigid body's frame, the direction of the angular momentum moves along one of the curves drawn here. It returns to its starting direction periodically.

A free rigid body tumbling in free space has two conserved quantities: energy and angular momentum vector $E, \vec L$. Viewed from within the rigid body's frame, the angular momentum direction is moving about, but its length is preserved. After a certain time $T$, the angular momentum direction would return to its starting point.

Viewed in the inertial frame, the body has undergone a rotation (since all elements in SO(3) are rotations). A classical result states that during time $T$, the body has rotated by angle
$$2ET/\|\vec L\| - \Omega$$

where $\Omega$ is the solid angle swept by the angular momentum direction as viewed from within the rigid body's frame.

=== Other examples ===
In systems with more than one degree of freedom, Hannay angle may no longer have an interpretation of merely a geometric contribution to the angle variable. An elementary example is the geometric angle in adiabatically driven anisotropic oscillator.

If a frictionless flywheel is fixed to the surface of a rotating disk, and the flywheel is not parallel to the surface, then after a single rotation, the flywheel would rotate. This is essentially a tabletop version of Foucault's pendulum. More generally, if the flywheel is transported over a curved surface such that its axis is always perpendicular to the local surface, then after performing a full loop on the surface, the flywheel would be rotated by the integral of Gaussian curvature enclosed by the curve.

Stated in another way, consider a heavy symmetric top in free space spinning around its symmetric axis at velocity $\omega$. Now force its symmetric axis to trace out a loop in space. The component of angular velocity of the top along its axis is exactly constant (not just adiabatically). When the loop is finished, the top would return to its previous direction, except that it has rotated by $\omega T + \theta$, where $T$ is the time taken for performing the loop, and $\theta$ is the solid angle traced out by the axis. The $\omega T$ is the dynamical term and $\theta$ is the Hannay angle.

The orbit of earth, periodically perturbed by the orbit of Jupiter. The rotational transform associated with the magnetic surfaces of a toroidal magnetic field with a nonplanar axis.
