= Wannier function =

Physical function

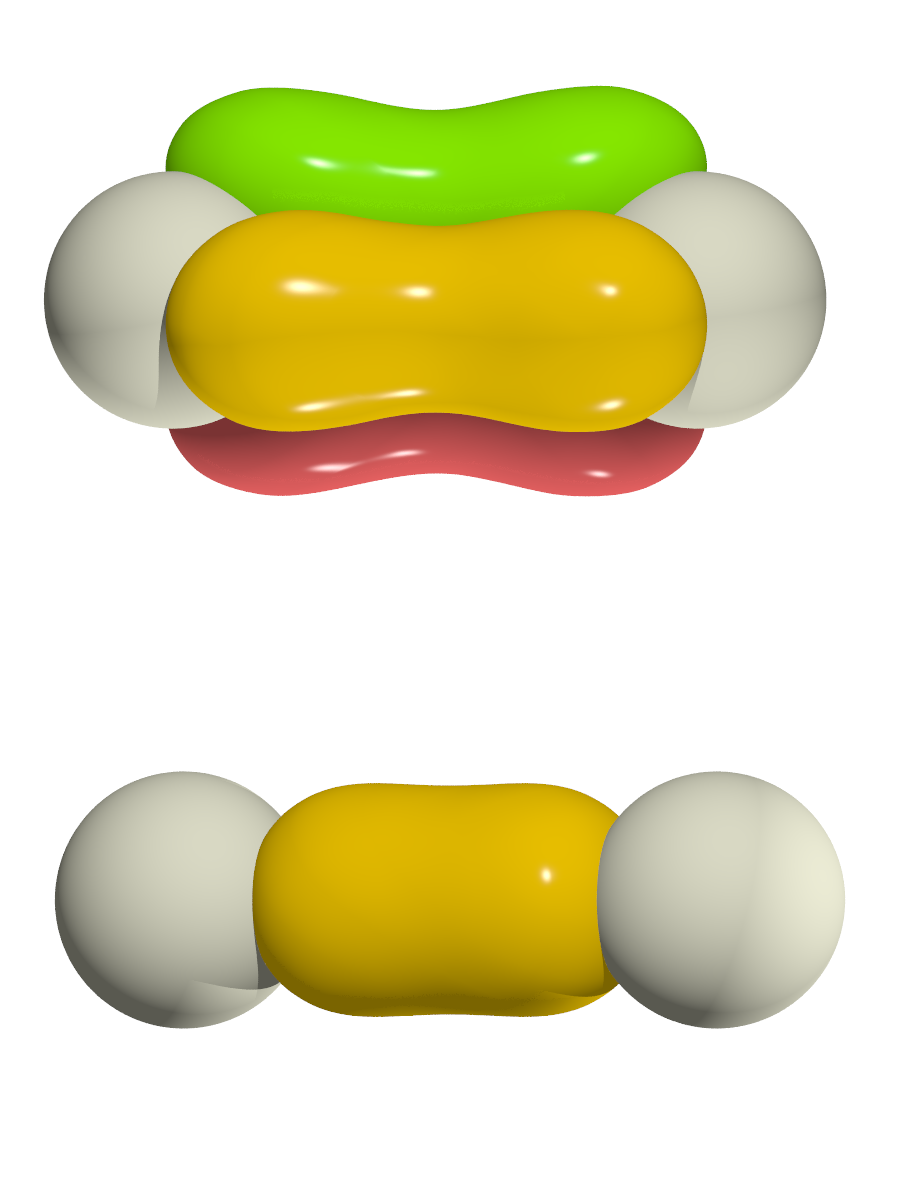
Wannier functions of triple- and single-bonded nitrogen dimers in palladium nitride.

The Wannier functions are a complete set of orthogonal functions used in solid-state physics. They were introduced by Gregory Wannier in 1937. Wannier functions are the localized molecular orbitals of crystalline systems.

The Wannier functions for different lattice sites in a crystal are orthogonal, allowing a convenient basis for the expansion of electron states in certain regimes. Wannier functions have found widespread use, for example, in the analysis of binding forces acting on electrons.

== Definition ==
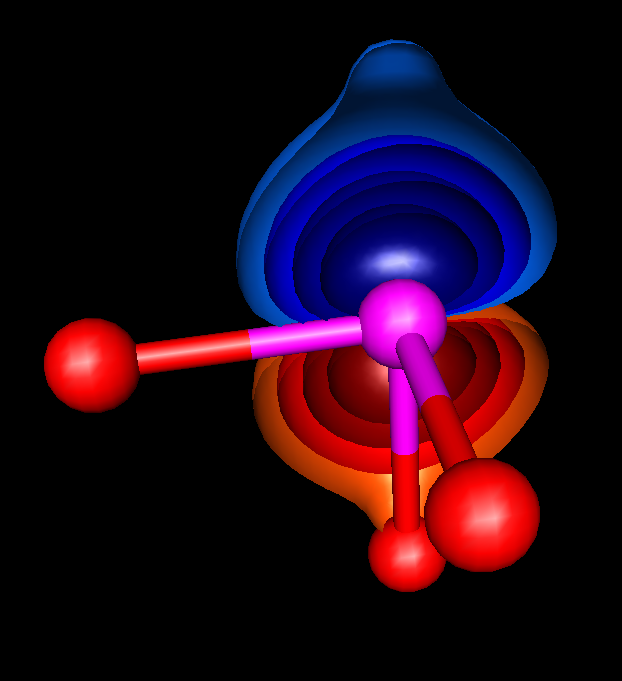
Example of a localized Wannier function of titanium in barium titanate (BaTiO3)

Although, like localized molecular orbitals, Wannier functions can be chosen in many different ways, the original, simplest, and most common definition in solid-state physics is as follows. Choose a single band in a perfect crystal, and denote its Bloch states by

$$\psi_{\mathbf{k}}(\mathbf{r}) = e^{i\mathbf{k}\cdot\mathbf{r}}u_\mathbf{k}(\mathbf{r})$$

where u_{k}(r) has the same periodicity as the crystal. Then the Wannier functions are defined by

$$\phi_{\mathbf{R}}(\mathbf{r}) = \frac{1}{\sqrt{N}} \sum_{\mathbf{k}} e^{-i\mathbf{k}\cdot\mathbf{R}} \psi_{\mathbf{k}}(\mathbf{r})$$,

where

- R is any lattice vector (i.e., there is one Wannier function for each Bravais lattice vector);
- N is the number of primitive cells in the crystal;
- The sum on k includes all the values of k in the Brillouin zone (or any other primitive cell of the reciprocal lattice) that are consistent with periodic boundary conditions on the crystal. This includes N different values of k, spread out uniformly through the Brillouin zone. Since N is usually very large, the sum can be written as an integral according to the replacement rule:

$$\sum_{\mathbf{k}} \longrightarrow \frac{\sqrt{N}}{\Omega} \int_\text{BZ} d^3\mathbf{k}$$

where "BZ" denotes the Brillouin zone, which has volume Ω.

=== Properties ===
On the basis of this definition, the following properties can be proven to hold:

- For any lattice vector R' ,

$$\phi_{\mathbf{R}}(\mathbf{r}) = \phi_{\mathbf{R}+\mathbf{R}'}(\mathbf{r}+\mathbf{R}')$$

In other words, a Wannier function only depends on the quantity (r − R). As a result, these functions are often written in the alternative notation

$$\phi(\mathbf{r}-\mathbf{R}) := \phi_{\mathbf{R}}(\mathbf{r})$$

- The Bloch functions can be written in terms of Wannier functions as follows:

$$\psi_{\mathbf{k}}(\mathbf{r}) = \frac{1}{\sqrt{N}} \sum_{\mathbf{R}} e^{i\mathbf{k}\cdot\mathbf{R}} \phi_{\mathbf{R}}(\mathbf{r})$$,

where the sum is over each lattice vector R in the crystal.

- The set of wavefunctions $\phi_{\mathbf{R}}$ is an orthonormal basis for the band in question.

$$\begin{align}
\int_\text{crystal}  \phi_{\mathbf{R}}(\mathbf{r})^* \phi_{\mathbf{R'}}(\mathbf{r}) d^3\mathbf{r} & = \frac{1}{N} \sum_{\mathbf{k,k'}}\int_\text{crystal} e^{i\mathbf{k}\cdot\mathbf{R}} \psi_{\mathbf{k}}(\mathbf{r})^*  e^{-i\mathbf{k'}\cdot\mathbf{R'}} \psi_{\mathbf{k'}}(\mathbf{r}) d^3\mathbf{r} \\
& =  \frac{1}{N} \sum_{\mathbf{k,k'}} e^{i\mathbf{k}\cdot\mathbf{R}} e^{-i\mathbf{k'}\cdot\mathbf{R'}} \delta_{\mathbf{k,k'}} \\
& = \frac{1}{N} \sum_{\mathbf{k}} e^{i\mathbf{k}\cdot\mathbf{(R-R')}} \\
& =\delta_{\mathbf{R,R'}}
\end{align}$$

Wannier functions have been extended to nearly periodic potentials as well.

=== Localization ===
The Bloch states ψ_{k}(r) are defined as the eigenfunctions of a particular Hamiltonian, and are therefore defined only up to an overall phase. By applying a phase transformation e^{iθ(k)} to the functions ψ_{k}(r), for any (real) function θ(k), one arrives at an equally valid choice. While the change has no consequences for the properties of the Bloch states, the corresponding Wannier functions are significantly changed by this transformation.

One therefore uses the freedom to choose the phases of the Bloch states in order to give the most convenient set of Wannier functions. In practice, this is usually the maximally-localized set, in which the Wannier function ϕ_{R} is localized around the point R and rapidly goes to zero away from R. For the one-dimensional case, it has been proved by Walter Kohn that there is always a unique choice that gives these properties (subject to certain symmetries). This consequently applies to any separable potential in higher dimensions; the general conditions are not established, and are the subject of ongoing research.

The Pipek–Mezey localization scheme has also been recently proposed for obtaining Wannier functions. Contrary to the maximally localized Wannier functions (which are an application of the Foster–Boys scheme to crystalline systems), the Pipek–Mezey Wannier functions do not mix σ and π orbitals.

==== Rigorous results ====
The existence of exponentially localized Wannier functions in insulators was proved mathematically in 2006.

== Modern theory of polarization ==
Wannier functions have recently found application in describing the polarization in crystals, for example, ferroelectrics. The modern theory of polarization is pioneered by Raffaele Resta and David Vanderbilt. See for example, Berghold, and Nakhmanson, and a power-point introduction by Vanderbilt. The polarization per unit cell in a solid can be defined as the dipole moment of the Wannier charge density:

$$\mathbf{p_c} = -e \sum_n \int\ d^3 r \,\, \mathbf{r} |W_n(\mathbf{r})|^2 \ ,$$

where the summation is over the occupied bands, and W_{n} is the Wannier function localized in the cell for band n. The change in polarization during a continuous physical process is the time derivative of the polarization and also can be formulated in terms of the Berry phase of the occupied Bloch states.

== Wannier interpolation ==
Wannier functions are often used to interpolate bandstructures calculated ab initio on a coarse grid of k-points to any arbitrary k-point. This is particularly useful for evaluation of Brillouin-zone integrals on dense grids and searching of Weyl points, and also taking derivatives in the k-space. This approach is similar in spirit to the tight binding approximation, but in contrast allows for an exact description of bands in a certain energy range. Wannier interpolation schemes have been derived for spectral properties, anomalous Hall conductivity, orbital magnetization, thermoelectric and electronic transport properties, gyrotropic effects, shift current, spin Hall conductivity and other effects.

== See also ==
- Orbital magnetization

== See also ==
- Bloch's theorem
- Hannay angle
- Geometric phase
