= List of Clarivate Citation laureates in Physics =

The following is a list of Clarivate Citation Laureates in Physics, considered likely candidates to win the Nobel Prize in Physics. Since 2025, twenty-two of the selected citation laureates starting in 2008 were eventually awarded the Nobel Prize: Albert Fert and Peter Grünberg (2007), Andre Geim and Konstantin Novoselov (2010), Dan Shechtman in Chemistry (2011), Saul Perlmutter, Adam Riess and Brian Schmidt (2011), François Englert and Peter W. Higgs (2013), Shuji Nakamura (2014), Arthur B. McDonald (2015), Kip Thorne and Rainer Weiss (2017), Michel Mayor and Didier P. Queloz (2019), Roger Penrose (2020), Giorgio Parisi (2021), Alain Aspect, John Clauser and Anton Zeilinger (2022), and Ferenc Krausz (2023).

== Laureates ==
	Citation Laureates	Nationality	Motivations	Institute
2002–2005
	Michael Green (born 1946)	United Kingdom	"for their pioneering contributions on string theory."	University of Cambridge
	John Henry Schwarz (born 1941)	United States	"for their pioneering contributions on string theory."	California Institute of Technology
	Edward Witten (born 1951)	United States	"for their pioneering contributions on string theory."	Princeton University
	Yoshinori Tokura (Note: Tokura was named a Citation Laureate in 2002 and 2014.) (born 1954)	Japan	"for research on correlated electron systems and topological aspects of condensed matters."	The University of Tokyo
^{2014}	Shuji Nakamura (born 1954)	United States	"for designing a method for producing the first commercial high brightness gallium nitride (GaN) LED."	University of California, Santa Barbara
2006
^{2007}	Albert Fert (born 1938)	France	"for discovering giant magnetoresistance (GMR) in magnetic multilayers, making a pioneering breakthrough for spintronics."	Paris-Saclay University
^{2007}	Peter Grünberg (1939–2018)	Germany	"for discovering giant magnetoresistance (GMR) in magnetic multilayers, making a pioneering breakthrough for spintronics."	University of Cologne; Tohoku University
	Alan Guth (born 1947)	United States	"for pioneering contributions on the theories of cosmic inflation, eternal inflation and inflationary multiverse."	Massachusetts Institute of Technology
	Andrei Linde (born 1948)	Russia; United States	"for pioneering contributions on the theories of cosmic inflation, eternal inflation and inflationary multiverse."	Stanford University
	Paul Steinhardt (born 1952)	United States	"for pioneering contributions on the theories of cosmic inflation, eternal inflation and inflationary multiverse."	Princeton University
	Emmanuel Desurvire (born 1955)	France	"for contributions in the development of erbium-doped fiber amplifiers (EDFA)."	Columbia University
	Masataka Nakazawa (born 1952)	Japan	"for contributions in the development of erbium-doped fiber amplifiers (EDFA)."	Tohoku University
	David N. Payne (born 1944)	United Kingdom	"for contributions in the development of erbium-doped fiber amplifiers (EDFA)."	University of Southampton
2007
	Sumio Iijima (born 1939)	Japan	"for his significant contribution on carbon nanotubes."	Meijo University
^{2015}	Arthur B. McDonald (born 1943)	Canada	"for discovering neutrino oscillations and demonstrating that neutrinos have mass."	Princeton University; Queen's University, Kingston
	Martin Rees (born 1942)	United Kingdom	"for contributions to physical cosmology, especially on high-energy astrophysics, galaxies and structure formation."	University of Cambridge; University of Sussex
2008
^{2010}	Andre Geim (born 1958)	Netherlands; United Kingdom	"for their discovery and analysis of graphene."	University of Manchester
^{2010}	Konstantin Novoselov (born 1974)	Russia; United Kingdom	"for their discovery and analysis of graphene."	University of Manchester
—N/a	Vera Rubin (1928–2016)	United States	"for her pioneering research indicating the existence of dark matter in the universe."	Carnegie Institution of Washington
^{2020}	Roger Penrose (born 1931)	United Kingdom	"for their related discoveries of, Penrose-tilings and quasicrystals, respectively."	University of Oxford
^{2011}	Dan Shechtman (born 1941)	Israel	"for their related discoveries of, Penrose-tilings and quasicrystals, respectively."	Iowa State University; Technion – Israel Institute of Technology
2009
	Yakir Aharonov (born 1932)	Israel	"for their discovery of the Aharonov–Bohm effect and the related Berry phase, respectively."	Chapman University; Tel Aviv University
	Michael Berry (born 1941)	United Kingdom	"for their discovery of the Aharonov–Bohm effect and the related Berry phase, respectively."	University of Bristol
	Juan Ignacio Cirac Sasturain (born 1965)	Spain	"for their pioneering research on quantum optics and quantum computing."	Max Planck Institute for Quantum Optics
	Peter Zoller (born 1952)	Austria	"for their pioneering research on quantum optics and quantum computing."	University of Innsbruck; Austrian Academy of Sciences
	John Pendry (born 1943)	United Kingdom	"for their prediction and discovery of negative refraction."	Imperial College London
—N/a	Sheldon Schultz (1933–2017)	United States	"for their prediction and discovery of negative refraction."	University of California, San Diego
	David R. Smith (born 1964)	United States	"for their prediction and discovery of negative refraction."	Duke University
2010
	Charles L. Bennett (born 1956)	United States	"for discoveries deriving from the Wilkinson Microwave Anisotropy Probe (WMAP), including the age of the universe, its topography, and its composition."	Johns Hopkins University; National Aeronautics and Space Administration
	Lyman Page (born 1957)	United States	"for discoveries deriving from the Wilkinson Microwave Anisotropy Probe (WMAP), including the age of the universe, its topography, and its composition."	Princeton University
	David Spergel (born 1961)	United States	"for discoveries deriving from the Wilkinson Microwave Anisotropy Probe (WMAP), including the age of the universe, its topography, and its composition."	Princeton University
	Thomas Ebbesen (born 1954)	Norway	"for observation and explanation of the transmission of light through subwavelength holes, which ignited the field of surface plasmon photonics."	University of Strasbourg; Institute of Science and Supramolecular Engineering
^{2011}	Saul Perlmutter (born 1959)	United States	"for discoveries of the accelerating rate of the expansion of the universe, and its implications for the existence of dark energy."	University of California, Berkeley; Lawrence Berkeley National Laboratory
^{2011}	Adam Riess (born 1969)	United States	"for discoveries of the accelerating rate of the expansion of the universe, and its implications for the existence of dark energy."	Johns Hopkins University; Space Telescope Science Institute
^{2011}	Brian Schmidt (born 1967)	United States	"for discoveries of the accelerating rate of the expansion of the universe, and its implications for the existence of dark energy."	Australian National University
2011
^{2022}	Alain Aspect (born 1947)	France	"for their tests of Bell inequalities and research on quantum entanglement."	Institut d'Optique; École Polytechnique
^{2022}	John Clauser (born 1942)	United States	"for their tests of Bell inequalities and research on quantum entanglement."	Lawrence Berkeley National Laboratory
^{2022}	Anton Zeilinger (born 1945)	Austria	"for their tests of Bell inequalities and research on quantum entanglement."	University of Vienna; Austrian Academy of Sciences
	Sajeev John (born 1957)	India; Canada	"for their invention and development of photonic band gap materials."	University of Toronto
	Eli Yablonovitch (born 1946)	United States	"for their invention and development of photonic band gap materials."	University of California, Berkeley
	Hideo Ohno (born 1954)	Japan	"for contributions to ferromagnetism in diluted magnetic semiconductors."	Tohoku University; Research Institute of Electronic Communication
2012
	Charles H. Bennett (born 1943)	United States	"for their pioneering description of a protocol for quantum teleportation, which has since been experimentally verified."	IBM Research
	Gilles Brassard (born 1955)	Canada	"for their pioneering description of a protocol for quantum teleportation, which has since been experimentally verified."	University of Montreal
	William Wootters (born 1951)	United States	"for their pioneering description of a protocol for quantum teleportation, which has since been experimentally verified."	Williams College
	Leigh Canham (born 1958)	United Kingdom	"for discovery of photoluminescence in porous silicon."	University of Birmingham
	Stephen E. Harris (born 1936)	United States	"for the experimental demonstration of electromagnetically induced transparency (Harris) and of 'slow light' (Harris and Hau)."	Stanford University
	Lene Hau (born 1959)	Denmark	"for the experimental demonstration of electromagnetically induced transparency (Harris) and of 'slow light' (Harris and Hau)."	Harvard University
2013
^{2013}	François Englert (1932-2026)	Belgium	"for their prediction of the Brout-Englert-Higgs boson."	Universite Libre de Bruxelles; Chapman University
^{2013}	Peter W. Higgs (1929-2024)	United Kingdom	"for their prediction of the Brout-Englert-Higgs boson."	University of Edinburgh
	Hideo Hosono (born 1953)	Japan	"for his discovery of iron-based superconductors."	Tokyo Institute of Technology
	Geoffrey Marcy (born 1954)	United States	"for their discoveries of extrasolar planets."	University of California, Berkeley
^{2019}	Michel Mayor (born 1942)	Switzerland	"for their discoveries of extrasolar planets."	University of Geneva
^{2019}	Didier P. Queloz (born 1966)	Switzerland	"for their discoveries of extrasolar planets."	University of Geneva; University of Cambridge
2014
	Charles L. Kane (born 1963)	United States	"for theoretical and experimental research on the quantum spin Hall effect and topological insulators."	University of Pennsylvania
	Laurens W. Molenkamp (born 1956)	Netherlands	"for theoretical and experimental research on the quantum spin Hall effect and topological insulators."	University of Würzburg
—N/a	Shoucheng Zhang (1963–2018)	China; United States	"for theoretical and experimental research on the quantum spin Hall effect and topological insulators."	Stanford University
—N/a	James F. Scott (1942–2020)	United States	"for their pioneering research on ferroelectric memory devices (Scott) and new multiferroic materials (Ramesh and Tokura)."	University of Cambridge
	Ramamoorthy Ramesh (born 1960)	India; United States	"for their pioneering research on ferroelectric memory devices (Scott) and new multiferroic materials (Ramesh and Tokura)."	University of California, Berkeley
	Yoshinori Tokura (born 1954)	Japan	"for their pioneering research on ferroelectric memory devices (Scott) and new multiferroic materials (Ramesh and Tokura)."	University of Tokyo
	Peidong Yang (born 1971)	China; United States	"for his contributions to nanowire photonics including the creation of first nanowire nanolaser."	University of California, Berkeley; Lawrence Berkeley National Laboratory
2015
	Paul Corkum (born 1943)	Canada	"for contributions to the development of attosecond physics."	University of Ottawa
^{2023}	Ferenc Krausz (born 1962)	Hungary	"for contributions to the development of attosecond physics."	Max Planck Institute for Quantum Optics; LMU Munich
—N/a	Deborah S. Jin (1968–2016)	United States	"for pioneering research on atomic gases at ultra-cold temperatures and the creation of the first fermionic condensate."	University of Colorado
	Zhong Lin Wang (born 1961)	China; United States	"for his invention of piezotronic and piezophototronic nanogenerators."	Georgia Institute of Technology
2016
	Marvin L. Cohen (born 1935)	United States	"for theoretical studies of solid materials, prediction of their properties, and especially for the empirical pseudopotential method."	University of California, Berkeley; Lawrence Berkeley National Laboratory
—N/a	Ronald Drever (1931–2017)	United Kingdom	"for the development of the Laser Interferometer Gravitational-Wave Observatory (LIGO) that made possible the detection of gravitational waves."	California Institute of Technology
^{2017}	Kip Thorne (born 1940)	United States	"for the development of the Laser Interferometer Gravitational-Wave Observatory (LIGO) that made possible the detection of gravitational waves."	California Institute of Technology
^{2017}	Rainer Weiss (born 1932)	United States	"for the development of the Laser Interferometer Gravitational-Wave Observatory (LIGO) that made possible the detection of gravitational waves."	
	Celso Grebogi (born 1947)	Brazil	"for their description of a control theory of chaotic systems, the OGY method."	University of Aberdeen
	Edward Ott (born 1941)	United States	"for their description of a control theory of chaotic systems, the OGY method."	University of Maryland
	James A. Yorke (born 1941)	United States	"for their description of a control theory of chaotic systems, the OGY method."	University of Maryland
2017
	Phaedon Avouris (born 1945)	Greece	"for seminal contributions to carbon-based electronics."	Thomas J. Watson Research Center
	Cornelis Dekker (born 1949)	Netherlands	"for seminal contributions to carbon-based electronics."	Delft University of Technology
	Paul McEuen (born 1963)	United States	"for seminal contributions to carbon-based electronics."	Cornell University
—N/a	Mitchell Feigenbaum (1944–2019)	United States	"for pioneering discoveries in nonlinear and chaotic physical systems and for identification of the Feigenbaum constants."	Rockefeller University
	Rashid Sunyaev (born 1943)	Russia; Germany	"for his profound contributions to our understanding of the universe, including its origins, galactic formation processes, disk accretion of black holes, and many other cosmological phenomena."	Max Planck Institute for Astrophysics; Russian Academy of Sciences
2018
	David Awschalom (born 1956)	United States	"for observation of the spin Hall effect in semiconductors."	University of Chicago
—N/a	Arthur Gossard (1935–2022)	United States	"for observation of the spin Hall effect in semiconductors."	University of California, Santa Barbara
	Sandra Faber (born 1944)	United States	"for pioneering methods to determine the age, size and distance of galaxies and for other contributions to cosmology."	University of California, Santa Cruz
	Yury Gogotsi (born 1961)	Ukraine	"for discoveries advancing the understanding and development of carbon-based materials, including for capacitive energy storage and understanding the mechanisms of operation of supercapacitors."	Drexel Nanomaterials Institute
	Rodney S. Ruoff (born 1957)	United States	"for discoveries advancing the understanding and development of carbon-based materials, including for capacitive energy storage and understanding the mechanisms of operation of supercapacitors."	Ulsan National Institute of Science and Technology
	Patrice Simon (born 1969)	France	"for discoveries advancing the understanding and development of carbon-based materials, including for capacitive energy storage and understanding the mechanisms of operation of supercapacitors."	Université Paul Sabatier
2019
	Artur Ekert (born 1961)	Poland; United Kingdom	"for contributions to quantum computation and quantum cryptography."	Oxford University; National University of Singapore
	Tony Heinz (born 1956)	United States	"for pioneering research on optical and electronic properties of two-dimensional nanomaterials."	Stanford University; SLAC National Accelerator Laboratory
	John Perdew (born 1943)	United States	"for advances in density functional theory of electronic structure, revealing 'nature's glue'."	Temple University
2020
	Thomas L. Carroll (born ?)	United States	"for research in nonlinear dynamics including synchronization of chaotic systems."	United States Naval Research Laboratory
	Louis M. Pecora (born 1947)	United States	"for research in nonlinear dynamics including synchronization of chaotic systems."	United States Naval Research Laboratory
	Hongjie Dai (born 1966)	China; United States	"for fabrication and novel applications of carbon and boron nitride nanotubes."	Stanford University
	Alex Zettl (born 1956)	United States	"for fabrication and novel applications of carbon and boron nitride nanotubes."	University of California, Berkeley; Lawrence Berkeley National Laboratory
	Carlos Frenk (born 1951)	Mexico; United Kingdom	"for their fundamental studies of galaxy formation and evolution, cosmic structure, and dark matter halos."	Durham University
	Julio Navarro (born 1962)	Argentina; Canada	"for their fundamental studies of galaxy formation and evolution, cosmic structure, and dark matter halos."	University of Victoria
	Simon White (born 1951)	United Kingdom	"for their fundamental studies of galaxy formation and evolution, cosmic structure, and dark matter halos."	Max Planck Institute for Astrophysics
2021
	Alexei Kitaev (born 1963)	Russia; United States	"for topological quantum computation, in which quantum information is encoded and protected using topological properties of many-body systems."	California Institute of Technology
	Mark Newman (born ?)	United Kingdom; United States	"for wide-ranging research on network systems including work on community structure and random graph models."	University of Michigan
^{2021}	Giorgio Parisi (born 1948)	Italy	"for ground-breaking discoveries in quantum chromodynamics and in the study of complex disordered systems."	Sapienza University of Rome
2022
	Immanuel Bloch (born 1972)	Germany	"for ground-breaking research on quantum many-body systems using ultra-cold atomic and molecular gases, opening the way to quantum simulations of 'artificial solids'."	LMU Munich; Max Planck Institute of Quantum Optics
	Stephen Quake (born 1969)	United States	"for contributions to the physics of fluid phenomena on the nanoliter scale."	Stanford University; Chan Zuckerberg Initiative
	Takashi Taniguchi (born 1959)	Japan	"for fabrication of high-quality hexagonal boron nitride crystals, the availability of which enabled a revolution in research on the electronic behavior of two-dimensional materials."	National Institute for Materials Science
	Kenji Watanabe (born 1969)	Japan	"for fabrication of high-quality hexagonal boron nitride crystals, the availability of which enabled a revolution in research on the electronic behavior of two-dimensional materials."	National Institute for Materials Science
2023
	Sharon C. Glotzer (born 1964)	United States	"for demonstrating the role of entropy in the self-assembly of matter and for introducing strategies to control the assembly process to engineer new materials."	University of Michigan, Ann Arbor
	Federico Capasso (born 1949)	Italy; United States	"for pioneering research on photonics, plasmonics, and metasurfaces, as well as contributions to the invention of and improvements on the quantum cascade laser."	Harvard University, Cambridge
	Stuart S. P. Parkin (born 1955)	United Kingdom; Germany	"for research on spintronics and specifically the development of racetrack memory for increased data storage density."	Martin Luther University Halle-Wittenberg
2024
	Rafi Bistritzer (born 1974)	Israel	"for pioneering theoretical and experimental contributions to the physics of magic angle twisted bilayer graphene and related moiré quantum devices."	Tel Aviv University
	Pablo Jarillo-Herrero (born 1976)	Spain	"for pioneering theoretical and experimental contributions to the physics of magic angle twisted bilayer graphene and related moiré quantum devices."	Massachusetts Institute of Technology
	Allan H. MacDonald (born 1951)	Canada; United States	"for pioneering theoretical and experimental contributions to the physics of magic angle twisted bilayer graphene and related moiré quantum devices."	University of Texas at Austin
	David Deutsch (born 1953)	United Kingdom	"for revolutionary contributions to quantum algorithms and computing."	Oxford University
	Peter Shor (born 1959)	United States	"for revolutionary contributions to quantum algorithms and computing."	Massachusetts Institute of Technology
	Christoph Gerber (born 1942)	Switzerland	"for invention and application of atomic force microscopy."	University of Basel
2025
	Ingrid Daubechies (born 1954)	Belgium; United States	"for advancing wavelet theory, a revolution in mathematics and physics with practical applications including image processing."	Duke University
	Stéphane Mallat (born 1962)	France	"for advancing wavelet theory, a revolution in mathematics and physics with practical applications including image processing."	Collège de France
	Yves Meyer (born 1939)	France	"for advancing wavelet theory, a revolution in mathematics and physics with practical applications including image processing."	École normale supérieure Paris-Saclay
	David DiVincenzo (born 1959)	United States	"for proposing the Loss-DiVincenzo model for quantum computing, using electron spins in quantum dots as qubits."	Peter Grünberg Institute; RWTH Aachen University
	Daniel Loss (born 1958)	Switzerland	"for proposing the Loss-DiVincenzo model for quantum computing, using electron spins in quantum dots as qubits."	University of Basel
	Ewine van Dishoeck (born 1955)	Netherlands	"for pioneering contributions to astrochemistry revealing interstellar molecular clouds and their role in star and planet formation."	Leiden University; Max Planck Institute for Extraterrestrial Physics
2026
	Chihaya Adachi (born 1963)	Japan	"for pioneering research on phosphorescent organic light-emitting diodes (PHOLEDs) and thermally activated delayed fluorescence (TADF), enabling ultrahigh-efficiency organic light-emitting diodes."	Kyushu University
	Stephen R. Forrest (born 1950)	United States	"for pioneering research on phosphorescent organic light-emitting diodes (PHOLEDs) and thermally activated delayed fluorescence (TADF), enabling ultrahigh-efficiency organic light-emitting diodes."	University of Michigan
	Mark E. Thompson (born 1956)	United States	"for pioneering research on phosphorescent organic light-emitting diodes (PHOLEDs) and thermally activated delayed fluorescence (TADF), enabling ultrahigh-efficiency organic light-emitting diodes."	University of Southern California
	Nicola Spaldin (born 1969)	Switzerland	"for fundamental theoretical developments leading to the establishment of room-temperature magnetoelectric multiferroics, which are enabling new energy-efficient device paradigms."	ETH Zurich
	Qikun Xue (born 1963)	China	"for experimental observation of the quantum anomalous Hall effect."	Tsinghua University
