= Miguel Ángel Fernández Sanjuán =

Spanish theoretical physicist

Miguel Angel Fernández Sanjuán
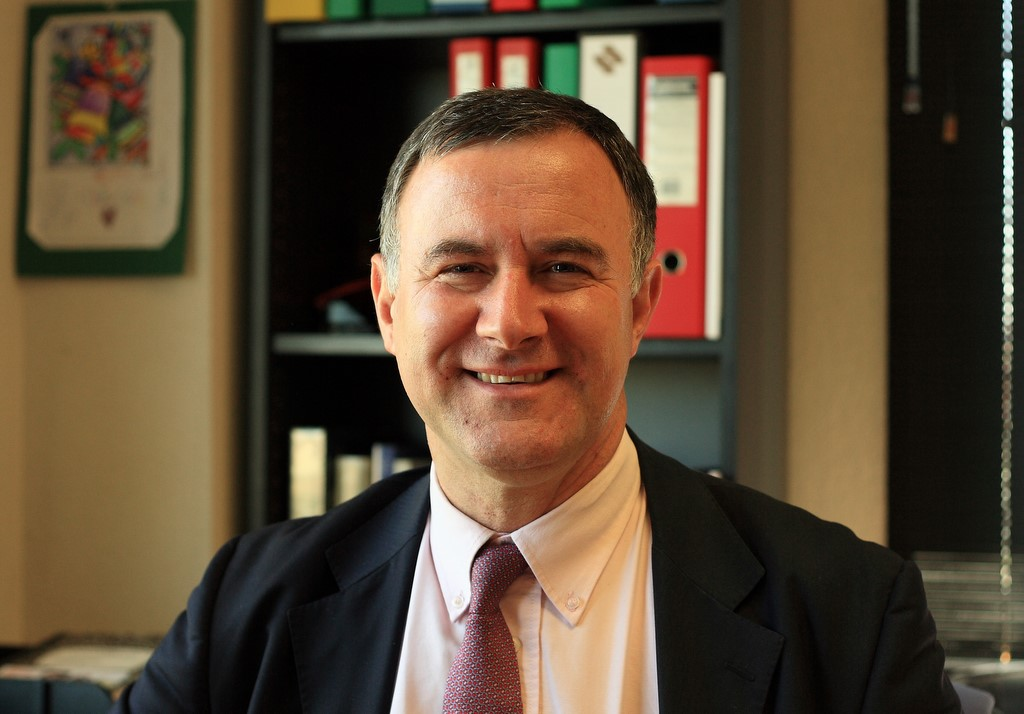
- Born: León
- Scientific career
- Fields: Physics (Nonlinear dynamics, Chaos theory)
- Institutions: Universidad Rey Juan Carlos

Miguel Angel Fernández Sanjuán (Miguel A. F. Sanjuán) is a Spanish Theoretical Physicist from Leon, Spain. He is known for his contributions in nonlinear dynamics, chaos theory, and control of chaos, and has published several scientific papers and popular news articles. He has supervised around 20 PhD students in Nonlinear Dynamics, Chaos and Complex Systems.

== Career ==
He was a professor at the University of Valladolid during the 1982–1984 period and later he became a professor at the Polytechnic University of Madrid, 1986–1997. Currently Miguel A. F. Sanjuán is a professor of physics at Rey Juan Carlos University in Madrid, Spain. He is also the director of the department of physics and the director of the Research Group on Nonlinear Dynamics, Chaos Theory and Complex Systems. He had coauthored several scientific articles with Celso Grebogi, Edward Ott, James A. Yorke, Ying-Cheng Lai and Lock Yue Chew etc. Prof. Miguel AF Sanjuán acted as Faculty Sponsor of the Doctorate Honoris Causa granted to Prof. James A. Yorke by the Universidad Rey Juan Carlos in Madrid, Spain, on January 28, 2014.

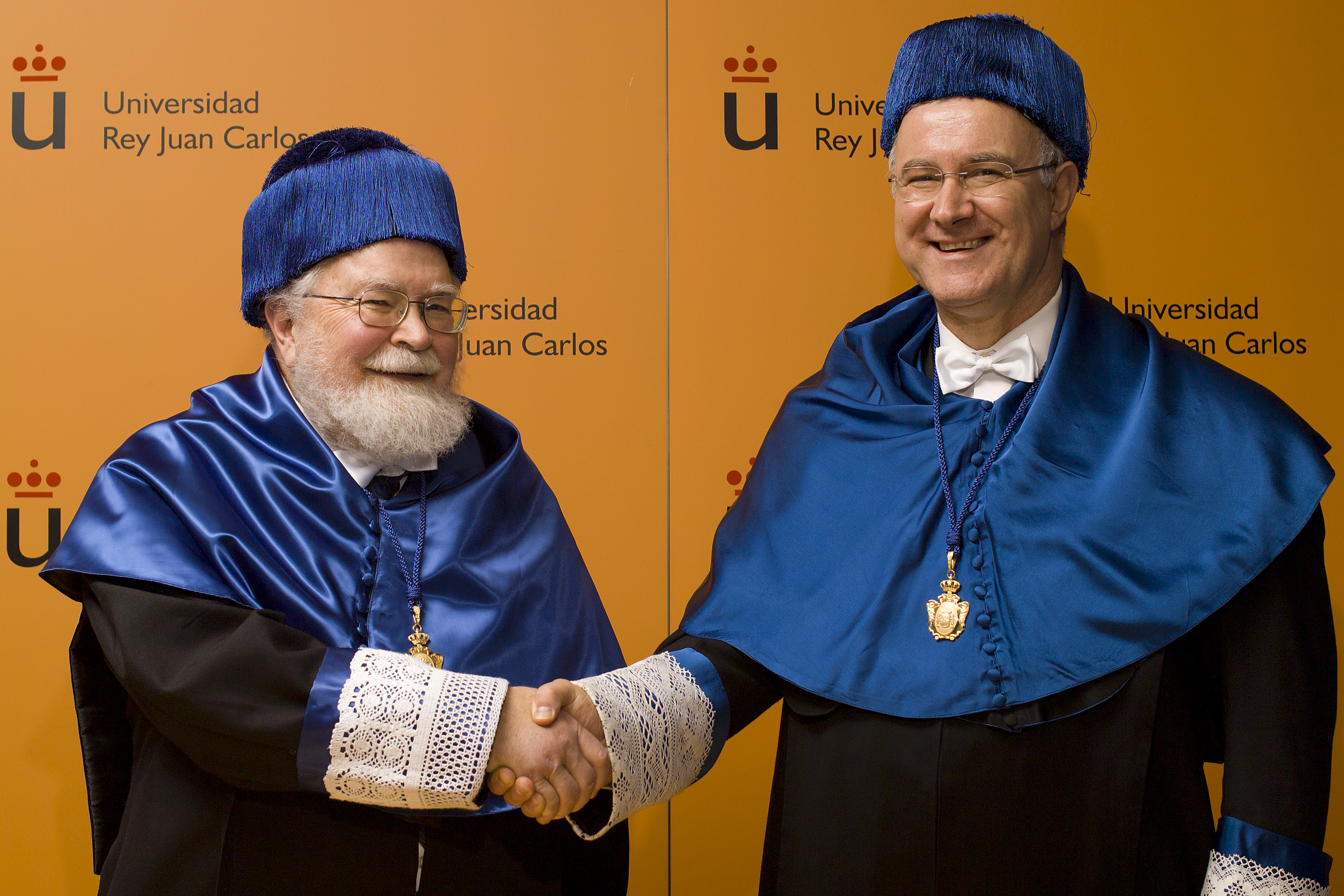
Prof. James A. Yorke and Prof. Miguel A. F. Sanjuán on the occasion of the Honorary doctorates ceremony at Universidad Rey Juan Carlos (2014).

== Awards ==
He is a foreign member of Lithuanian Academy of Sciences. In 2017, he was elected as ordinary member of the Academia Europaea.

On the year 2002, he has secured the fellowship of the Japan Society for the Promotion of Science. He has also worked as a visiting researcher in many countries, including Germany, Lithuania, Italy, the United States, Japan, Portugal, India, China. On the year 2015, Prof. Miguel A. F. Sanjuan became the elected member of Spanish Royal Academy of Sciences (Real Academia de Ciencias). Prof. Miguel Angel Fernandez Sanjuan has received one of the Research Excellence Awards in the category of Sciences granted by the Social Council of the Rey Juan Carlos University in 2016. In 2017 he has been Fulbright Visiting Research Scholar at the Institute of Physical Science and Technology of the University of Maryland at College Park.

== Writings ==
Together with Celso Grebogi (University of Aberdeen, UK) he was the editor of the book "Recent Progress In Controlling Chaos". On 2017 he has acted as the editor of the book titled Chaotic, Fractional, and Complex Dynamics, along with Mark Edelman and Elbert Macau.

He has authored a book in Spanish titled Las Matemáticas y la Física del Caos (Mathematics and Physics of Chaos), which is co-authored by Manuel de Leon of the Institute of Mathematical Sciences, CSIC. His active Spanish blog is greatly helping common public to improve the basic understanding of chaos theory and complexity. He has also written some popular articles in Spanish newspapers. On the year 2016, Prof. S. Rajasekar and Prof. Miguel A. F. Sanjuan have published a book on Nonlinear Resonances. He has also co-authored a book named Predictability of Chaotic Dynamics, which is primarily concerned with the computational aspects of predictability of dynamical systems.

== Research ==
He and his co-authors (Judy Kennedy, Edward Ott and James A. Yorke) have explored a temporally periodic flow with a time varying perturbation. In this flow, they showed the presence of indecomposable continua associated to the chaotic dynamics of the fluids. He was the first to prove numerically the Wada properties of the exit basins of an open Hamiltonian system.
