= Pyragas method =

In the mathematics of chaotic dynamical systems, in the Pyragas method of stabilizing a periodic orbit, an appropriate continuous controlling signal is injected into the system, whose intensity is nearly zero as the system evolves close to the desired periodic orbit but increases when it drifts away from the desired orbit. Both the Pyragas and OGY (Ott, Grebogi and Yorke) methods are part of a general class of methods called "closed loop" or "feedback" methods which can be applied based on knowledge of the system obtained through solely observing the behavior of the system as a whole over a suitable period of time. The method was proposed by Lithuanian physicist Kęstutis Pyragas.
