= Ji-Ping Huang =

Chinese theoretical physicist

- Ji-Ping Huang
- Born: 1977 (age 48–49); Jiangyan, Jiangsu, China
- Other name: 黄吉平 · Jiping Huang · J. P. Huang
- Education: Soochow University; The Chinese University of Hong Kong
- Scientific career
- Fields: Statistical physics, thermodynamics, complex systems Research focus: Transformation thermotics; thermal and diffusion metamaterials
- Workplaces: Fudan University; University of Shanghai for Science and Technology
- Website: thermotics.fudan.edu.cn

Ji-Ping Huang (Chinese: 黄吉平; born 1977), also published as Jiping Huang and J. P. Huang, is a Chinese theoretical physicist. He is a professor in the Department of Physics at Fudan University and Dean of the Faculty of Basic Sciences and Head of the School of Physics at the University of Shanghai for Science and Technology (USST). His research concerns statistical physics, thermodynamics, complex systems, thermal metamaterials, and diffusion metamaterials.

Huang and his collaborators helped extend coordinate-transformation ideas from wave physics to steady heat conduction. Their 2008 theoretical work showed how structured materials could redirect heat around a region while leaving the surrounding temperature field nearly unchanged. Independent experiments later demonstrated related heat-flow shielding, concentration, and reversal with layered materials. In 2013, Science discussed metamaterials beyond optics, while a Nature review examined sound and heat control. A later Nature Reviews Materials review surveyed thermal metamaterials and devices.

His later research expanded from static heat-flow control to devices that respond to temperature, keep a protected region at nearly constant temperature, or change function with liquid flow. Reviews he coauthored in Nature Reviews Physics and Reviews of Modern Physics place heat, particles, plasmas, and related systems within the broader framework of diffusion metamaterials.

== Education ==
Huang was born in Jiangyan, Jiangsu. He received his bachelor’s and master’s degrees from Soochow University in 1998 and 2000, respectively, and a doctorate from the Department of Physics at The Chinese University of Hong Kong in 2003.

== Career ==
Huang worked at Germany’s Max Planck Institute for Polymer Research from 2003 to 2005, first as a postdoctoral researcher, then as a Humboldt Research Fellow from September 2004 to August 2005. He joined Fudan University as a research fellow in September 2005 and became a professor in March 2007. In 2009, he was a visiting scholar in Harvard University’s Department of Physics.

In June 2025, he became Dean of the College of Science at the University of Shanghai for Science and Technology. Since March 2026, he has served as Dean of its Faculty of Basic Sciences and Head of its School of Physics.

== Research ==
=== Evolution of metamaterial physics ===
A metamaterial is an engineered structure whose large-scale behaviour depends strongly on how its smaller parts are arranged. The same bricks can make a wall or an arch; similarly, reshaping and rearranging small material units can change a structure’s response to light, sound, or heat. Design concerns both a material’s composition and how its parts work together.

The idea first became prominent in electromagnetism. In 1968, Viktor Veselago analyzed a hypothetical medium with negative electric and magnetic responses. John Pendry and colleagues proposed wire arrays for an unusual electric response in 1996 and split-ring resonators for an unusual magnetic response in 1999. Transformation optics added a design principle in 2006: a structured material could guide an electromagnetic field as though space itself had been reshaped. A region might thus be hidden from waves by steering them around it.

Metasurfaces concentrate wave control into a thin patterned interface. In 2011, researchers used arrays of metallic antennas spaced closer than a wavelength to impose position-dependent phase shifts—changes in the timing of light’s oscillations—at an interface. They generalized the laws of reflection and refraction and experimentally observed anomalous reflected and refracted beams. In 2012, researchers designed gradient metasurfaces whose spatially varying reflection phase coupled freely propagating electromagnetic waves into waves travelling along a surface, as shown through theory and microwave experiments.

In 2000, Zhengyou Liu, Ping Sheng, and colleagues demonstrated a locally resonant sonic material, extending the approach to sound. In 2006, Graeme W. Milton, Marc Briane, and John R. Willis studied how the equations of elastic motion change under coordinate transformations. They described material responses that could guide mechanical vibrations around a region, providing a theoretical framework for elastic-wave cloaking, conditional on realizing the required material properties.

Unlike light or sound, heat spreads and smooths out temperature differences rather than oscillating as a wave, but coordinate transformations can still design its path.

Huang and collaborators’ 2024 Reviews of Modern Physics review organizes the field into three broad branches by their governing equations: electromagnetic and optical waves, other waves such as sound and elasticity, and diffusion systems such as heat and particle transport. It identifies the 2008 work on transformed heat conduction as an early step in the diffusion branch.

Three research routes in metamaterial physics and selected milestones. The routes develop in parallel; milestones are ordered chronologically, but spacing is not proportional to elapsed time. The classification and historical development follow the 2024 review in Reviews of Modern Physics.

=== Transformation thermotics and thermal cloaking ===
In ordinary materials, heat follows the easiest available paths from hotter to colder regions. In 2008, Huang and collaborators showed that varying thermal conductivity with position and direction could bend those paths around a protected central region. The central object could then disturb externally measured temperatures much less. Their theory and simulations established this possibility for steady heat conduction.

The proposal helped establish transformation thermotics: using coordinate transformations to calculate material properties for controlling heat. Picture drawing desired heat-flow paths on a map, then finding a structure that makes heat follow them. The paper also studied ellipsoidal cloaking shells where part of the heat-flow pattern opposes the overall imposed temperature difference—an “apparent negative thermal conductivity” produced by the path’s shape, while local conduction still transfers heat from hotter to colder regions.

Later in 2008, Chen, Weng, and Chen published another thermal-cloaking design. Narayana and Sato’s independent 2012 experiment used alternating layers of ordinary materials to approximate the theoretically required direction-dependent response, demonstrating thermal shielding, concentration, and reversal. In a contemporary Nature Materials commentary, Philip Ball traced these engineered heat-flow proposals to Fan and colleagues’ 2008 paper. Later reviews treated thermal cloaking as an important example of metamaterial ideas moving beyond optics.

=== Realizable thermal metamaterials and thermal transparency ===
A central engineering problem is controlling heat flow with common, manufacturable materials. Ideal transformation designs may require continuously varying or strongly direction-dependent properties. Real devices approximate them with layers, composites, or other structures.

Huang’s group studied core-and-coating particles whose combined thermal response could match the background. Good matching leaves only a small external disturbance—a condition often called thermal transparency. Varying a particle’s shape, coating, and material proportions, or arranging several particles together, offers ways to design cloaking and camouflage with ordinary materials.

These approaches reduce an object’s disturbance of the surrounding temperature field. Effective-medium methods predict many small components’ overall response; scattering cancellation uses one part to compensate for another’s disturbance. A 2021 review of macroscopic heat control coauthored by Huang traced the progression from ideal transformation parameters to structured composites, experiments, and possible applications.

For complex geometries, Huang and collaborators proposed forward conformality-assisted tracing in 2024. It calculates material properties from a mesh of heat-flow lines and isotherms—lines joining points at the same temperature—or isothermal surfaces. The method designs free-form metamaterials with isotropic media, whose properties are the same in every direction. The study experimentally demonstrated two- and three-dimensional thermal cloaks and applied the method across physical systems, including thermal and electromagnetic fields.

In 2025, Huang and collaborators proposed rescaled Schwarz–Christoffel transformations for polygonal devices and their connections to the surrounding medium. Using isotropic materials, the method designs both the direction and density of energy flow, producing thermal and electromagnetic spreaders, guides, and cloaks while addressing boundary matching. Thermal devices were tested experimentally; electromagnetic designs were validated numerically.

=== Nonlinear and dynamic thermal control ===
Early transformation thermotics generally assumed fixed thermal conductivity. In 2015, Huang’s group incorporated materials whose conductivity changes with temperature. The resulting theory yielded designs for an automatically switching cloak and a macroscopic thermal diode, whose heat transfer depends on which side is hotter. Temperature thus became a control signal, not merely the quantity being controlled.

The group also built and tested a thermal-diode prototype using copper, insulating material, and a shape-memory alloy. Temperature-dependent contact between components produced different heat-transfer rates when the hot and cold ends were exchanged.

In 2016, the group reported temperature trapping. Materials on opposite sides of a central region responded differently to temperature, allowing changes in incoming and outgoing heat to compensate for environmental changes. Combining theory and experiment, the study maintained the central temperature without continuously powering a controller. In one experiment, raising the hot boundary from about 49°C to 80°C changed the central temperature from about 19.3°C to 21.2°C; a control sample changed by about 10°C. The American Physical Society featured the research in Physics.

Moving liquid also carries heat. In 2023, Huang and collaborators combined solid conduction and liquid convection in a liquid–solid hybrid metamaterial. Adjusting liquid flow let the experimentally tested device change continuously from guiding heat around its centre to concentrating it there, without rebuilding the structure.

The group also extended transformation methods to convection, radiation, and combined control of different heat-transfer mechanisms. These extensions approach everyday conditions: flow changes temperature distributions, radiation becomes significant at high temperatures, and several mechanisms can act together.

=== Diffusion metamaterials and diffusionics ===
Heat conduction exemplifies diffusion. Particle concentrations and plasma densities can spread in mathematically similar ways, allowing heat-control methods to be adapted to guide, concentrate, rotate, or conceal other diffusing quantities.

A 2023 Nature Reviews Physics article coauthored by Huang organized these developments as diffusion metamaterials, uniting coordinate transformations, effective-medium theory, scattering cancellation, and time modulation across heat, particles, and plasmas. The 2024 Reviews of Modern Physics review used diffusionics for the wider study and control of mass and energy diffusion, alongside the two wave-based branches of metamaterial physics.

The shared idea is to start with the desired distribution—where heat or particles should go—and work backward to a material structure. Redirecting steady heat flow thus became a design approach for a wider family of transport processes.

=== Topological, non-Hermitian and multiphysics diffusion ===
Topology concerns structural features that survive smooth changes of shape. In electronic and wave systems, topological design can produce states localized at edges or corners. Diffusion raises a different question: can a temperature pattern remain concentrated near a corner while its contrast gradually fades? A 2024 review coauthored by Huang surveyed how connections between thermal units shape this behaviour.

In 2024, Huang and collaborators reported a higher-order topological in-bulk corner state in a purely diffusive sphere-and-rod structure. The temperature pattern localized at a corner while its decay rate lay within the range of bulk states, a result examined through theory, simulation, and experiment. The work used heat diffusion to study localization in a dissipative system.

Time modulation offers another route to non-Hermitian behaviour, found in systems whose modes can grow or decay rather than only oscillate. A 2022 study introduced thermal Willis coupling, where variations in space and time link thermal quantities uncoupled in a stationary material. A paper published online in 2025 and assigned to a 2026 issue demonstrated temporal anti-parity–time symmetry. By varying diffusion and convection in time, three-ring-device experiments made a temperature peak travel with or against a flow, or remain near a selected position as the temperature contrast decayed.

A 2025 Chemical Reviews article united topological methods for thermal, particle, and plasma diffusion. These studies extend metamaterial design from controlling where heat goes to how its distribution changes in time.
