= Synchronization of chaos =

Synchronization of chaos is a phenomenon that may occur when two or more dissipative chaotic systems are coupled.

Because of the exponential divergence of the nearby trajectories of chaotic systems, having two chaotic systems evolving in synchrony might appear surprising. However, synchronization of coupled or driven chaotic oscillators is a phenomenon well established experimentally and reasonably well-understood theoretically.

The stability of synchronization for coupled systems can be analyzed using master stability. Synchronization of chaos is a well-studied phenomenon and a multi-disciplinary subject with a broad range of applications.

Synchronization may present a variety of forms depending on the nature of the interacting systems and the type of coupling, and the proximity between the systems.

== Identical synchronization ==
This type of synchronization is also known as complete synchronization. It can be observed for identical chaotic systems. The systems are said to be completely synchronized when there is a set of initial conditions so that the systems eventually evolve identically in time. In the simplest case of two diffusively coupled dynamics is described by

$$x^{\prime}  = F(x) + \alpha(y-x)$$
$$y^{\prime}  = F(y) + \alpha(x-y)$$

where $F$ is the vector field modeling the isolated chaotic dynamics and $\alpha$ is the coupling parameter. The regime $x(t) = y(t)$ defines an invariant subspace of the coupled system, if this subspace $x(t) = y(t)$ is locally attractive then the coupled system exhibit identical synchronization.

If the coupling vanishes the oscillators are decoupled, and the chaotic behavior leads to a divergence of nearby trajectories. Complete synchronization occurs due to the interaction, if the coupling parameter is large enough so that the divergence of trajectories of interacting systems due to chaos is suppressed by the diffusive coupling. To find the critical coupling strength we study the behavior of the difference $v = x - y$. Assuming that $v$ is small we can expand the vector field in series and obtain a linear differential equation - by neglecting the Taylor remainder - governing the behavior of the difference

$$v^{\prime}  =  DF(x(t)) v  - 2 \alpha v$$

where $DF(x(t))$ denotes the Jacobian of the vector field along the solution. If $\alpha = 0$ then we obtain

$$u^{\prime}  =  DF(x(t)) u,$$

and since the dynamics of chaotic we have $\| u(t) \| \le \| u(0) \| e^{\lambda t}$, where $\lambda$ denotes the maximum Lyapunov exponent of the isolated system. Now using the ansatz $v = u e^{-2 \alpha t}$ we pass from the equation for $v$ to the equation for $u$. Therefore, we obtain

$$\|v(t) \| \le \|u(0)\| e^{(-2 \alpha  +  \lambda) t}$$

yield a critical coupling strength $\alpha_c = \lambda/2$, for all $\alpha > \alpha_c$ the system exhibit complete synchronization. The existence of a critical coupling strength is related to the chaotic nature of the isolated dynamics.

In general, this reasoning leads to the correct critical coupling value for synchronization. However, in some cases one might observe loss of synchronization for coupling strengths larger than the critical value. This occurs because the nonlinear terms neglected in the derivation of the critical coupling value can play an important role and destroy the exponential bound for the behavior of the difference. It is however, possible to give a rigorous treatment to this problem and obtain a critical value so that the nonlinearities will not affect the stability.

== Generalized synchronization ==
This type of synchronization occurs mainly when the coupled chaotic oscillators are different, although it has also been reported between identical oscillators. Given the dynamical variables $(x_1,x_2,...x_n)$ and $(y_1,y_2,...y_m)$ that determine the state of the oscillators, generalized synchronization occurs when there is a functional, $\phi$, such that, after a transitory evolution from appropriate initial conditions, it is $[y_1(t),y_2(t),...,y_m(t)=\phi[x_1(t),x_2(t),...,x_n(t)]$. This means that the dynamical state of one of the oscillators is completely determined by the state of the other. When the oscillators are mutually coupled this functional has to be invertible, if there is a drive-response configuration the drive determines the evolution of the response, and Φ does not need to be invertible. Identical synchronization is the particular case of generalized synchronization when $\phi$ is the identity.

== Phase synchronization ==
Phase synchronization occurs when the coupled chaotic oscillators keep their phase difference bounded while their amplitudes remain uncorrelated. This phenomenon occurs even if the oscillators are not identical. Observation of phase synchronization requires a previous definition of the phase of a chaotic oscillator. In many practical cases, it is possible to find a plane in phase space in which the projection of the trajectories of the oscillator follows a rotation around a well-defined center. If this is the case, the phase is defined by the angle, φ(t), described by the segment joining the center of rotation and the projection of the trajectory point onto the plane. In other cases it is still possible to define a phase by means of techniques provided by the theory of signal processing, such as the Hilbert transform. In any case, if φ_{1}(t) and φ_{2}(t) denote the phases of the two coupled oscillators, synchronization of the phase is given by the relation nφ_{1}(t)=mφ_{2}(t) with m and n whole numbers.

== Anticipated and lag synchronization ==
In these cases, the synchronized state is characterized by a time interval τ such that the dynamical variables of the oscillators, $(x_1,x_2,...x_n)$ and $(x'_1,x'_2,...x'_n)$, are related by $x'_i(t)=x_i(t+\tau)$; this means that the dynamics of one of the oscillators follows, or anticipates, the dynamics of the other. Anticipated synchronization may occur between chaotic oscillators whose dynamics is described by delay differential equations, coupled in a drive-response configuration. In this case, the response anticipates the dynamics of the drive. Lag synchronization may occur when the strength of the coupling between phase-synchronized oscillators is increased.

== Amplitude envelope synchronization ==
This is a mild form of synchronization that may appear between two weakly coupled chaotic oscillators. In this case, there is no correlation between phases nor amplitudes; instead, the oscillations of the two systems develop a periodic envelope that has the same frequency in the two systems.

This has the same order of magnitude than the difference between the average frequencies of oscillation of the two chaotic oscillator. Often, amplitude envelope synchronization precedes phase synchronization in the sense that when the strength of the coupling between two amplitude envelope synchronized oscillators is increased, phase synchronization develops.

All these forms of synchronization share the property of asymptotic stability. This means that once the synchronized state has been reached, the effect of a small perturbation that destroys synchronization is rapidly damped, and synchronization is recovered again. Mathematically, asymptotic stability is characterized by a positive Lyapunov exponent of the system composed of the two oscillators, which becomes negative when chaotic synchronization is achieved.

Some chaotic systems allow even stronger control of chaos, and both synchronization of chaos and control of chaos constitute parts of what's known as "cybernetical physics".

== See also ==
- Kuramoto model
