= Thomas Ebbesen =

Franco-Norwegian physical chemist and professor (born 1954)

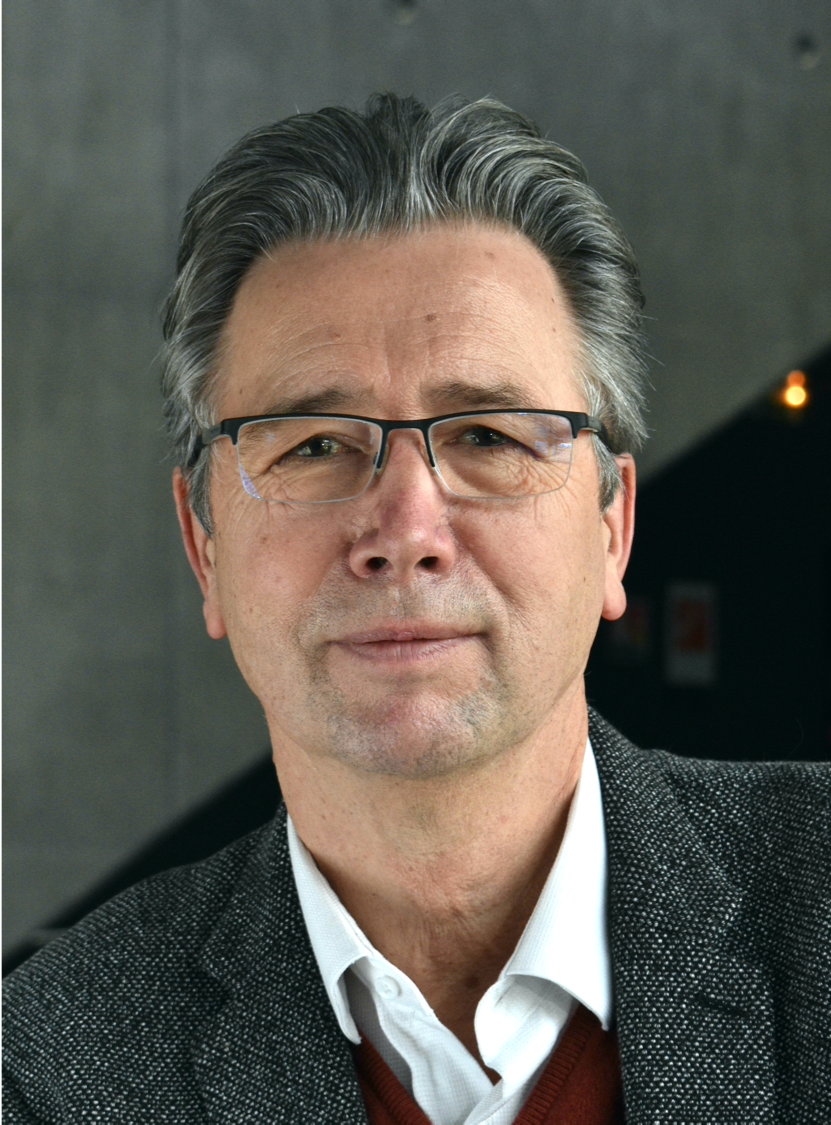
- Ebbesen in 2021
- Born: January 30, 1954 (age 72); Oslo, Norway
- Education: Oberlin College, Pierre and Marie Curie University (PhD)
- Known for: Extraordinary optical transmission
- Awards: 2014 Kavli Prize in Nanoscience; 2019 CNRS Gold medal
- Scientific career
- Workplaces: University of Strasbourg
- Thesis: Photoréduction monoélectronique du méthyl viologène (1986)

Thomas Wren Ebbesen (born 30 January 1954) is a Franco-Norwegian physical chemist and professor at the University of Strasbourg in France, known for his pioneering work in nanoscience. He received the Kavli Prize in Nanoscience “for transformative contributions to the field of nano-optics that have broken long-held beliefs about the limitations of the resolution limits of optical microscopy and imaging”, together with Stefan Hell, and Sir John Pendry in 2014.

== Academic career ==
Thomas Ebbesen obtained his bachelor's degree from Oberlin College, and a PhD from Pierre and Marie Curie University in Paris in the field of photo-physical chemistry. He then worked at the Notre Dame Radiation Laboratory before joining the NEC Fundamental Research Laboratories in Japan in 1988 where his research shifted first to novel carbon materials such as fullerenes (C_{60}), graphene and carbon nanotubes. After discovering how to mass-produce carbon nanotubes, he and his colleagues measured many of their unique features such as their mechanical and wetting properties. For his pioneering and extensive contribution to the field of carbon nanotubes, he shared the 2001 Agilent Europhysics Prize with Sumio Iijima, Cees Dekker and Paul McEuen.

While working at NEC, Ebbesen discovered a major new optical phenomenon. He found that, contrary to the then accepted theory, it was possible to transmit light extremely efficiently through subwavelength holes milled in opaque metal films under certain conditions. The phenomenon, known as extraordinary optical transmission, involves surface plasmons. It has raised fundamental questions and is finding applications in broad variety of areas from chemistry to opto-electronics.

Ebbesen has received several awards for the discovery of the extraordinary optical transmission such as the 2005 France Telecom Prize of the French Academy of Sciences and the 2009 Quantum Electronics and Optics Prize of the European Physical Society.

In 1999, Thomas Ebbesen joined ISIS founded by Jean-Marie Lehn at the University of Strasbourg, which he headed from 2004 to 2012. In 2017–2018, he held the L. Bettencourt chair for Technological Innovation at the Collège de France. He is currently the director of the International Center for Frontier Research in Chemistry. and the University of Strasbourg Institute for Advanced Study.

Since 2005 he has developed new field of research at the interface of quantum electrodynamics and physical chemistry. His team demonstrated for the first time that material properties such as chemical reactivity could be modified by strongly coupling the molecules to the electromagnetic fluctuations of an optical cavity. For this work he was awarded the 2018 Grand Prix of the Maison de la Chimie foundation.

He is a member of the Institut Universitaire de France, the Norwegian Academy of Science and Letters, the French Academy of Sciences and the Royal Flemish Academy of Belgium for Sciences and the Arts.

In 2019, he is awarded the CNRS Gold medal in France

== Honors and awards ==
- NEC Research Prize 1992
- Randers Prize 2001
- Agilent Europhysics Prize 2001
- Prix France Telecom 2005
- Tomassoni Prize 2009
- Scola Physica Romana Medal 2009
- Quantum Electronics and Optics Prize 2009
- Dr. scient. h.c., University of Southern Denmark 2009
- Clarivate Citation laureate in Physics 2010 "for observation and explanation of the transmission of light through subwavelength holes, which ignited the field of surface plasmon photonics."
- Kavli Prize in Nanoscience 2014
- Prix Special of the French Physics Society, 2014
- Honorary Doctorate, Oberlin College, USA 2015
- Knight of the French Legion of Honour
- Doctor honoris causa on the occasion of the KU Leuven Patron Saint‘s Day 2018
- Quinquennial Anniversary Award, European Materials Research Society 2018
- Grand prix de la fondation Maison de la Chimie 2018
- CNRS Gold medal 2019
