= Chihaya Adachi =

Japanese scientist

- Born: October 26, 1963 (age 62); Nagano, Japan
- Known for: Organic electronics, OLED, TADF, Hyperfluoresence
- Spouse: Mika Inoue
- Children: Yuuki, Akira
- Scientific career
- Institutions: Shinshu University; Chitose Institute of Science and Technology; Center for Organic Photonics and Electronics Research (OPERA) at Kyushu University
- Website: http://www.cstf.kyushu-u.ac.jp/~adachilab/lab/?lang=en

Chihaya Adachi (安達 千波矢, born 26 October 1963) is a Japanese scientist and lecturer specializing in organic electronics which is a field of materials science. Adachi is the Director of the Center for Organic Photonics and Electronics Research (OPERA) at Kyushu University, a large multi-disciplinary team of physicists, chemists, and engineers from both academia and industry.

Adachi is recognized as an innovator in the development of materials for organic light-emitting diodes (OLED). He has pioneered a new technology known as thermally activated delayed fluorescence (TADF).

In 2015, Adachi co-founded Kyulux in Fukuoka, Japan, to commercialize hyper-fluorescence TADF emitters, and he is a scientific advisor and ex-officio board member of Kyulux. Adachi also serves on Elsevier's Organic Electronics Editorial Board.

== Early career ==
Adachi held positions at Ricoh Co., Shinshu University, Princeton University, and at Chitose Institute of Science and Technology. He became a distinguished professor at Kyushu University in 2010, and his current posts also include director of Kyushu University's Center for Organic Photonics and Electronics Research (OPERA) since 2010.

== Education ==
Adachi obtained the degree of Bachelor of Science from Chuo University in 1986. He went on to earn his Master of Science degree in Kyushu University in 1988. Adachi obtained his doctorate in Materials Science and Technology in 1991 from Kyushu University.

== Research, patents and awards ==
Adachi has had over 515 papers published in the field of organic electronics. Adachi's lab in Kyushu University has filed over 180 patents since 1989. Adachi's work and achievements are regarded as fundamental to scientific understanding of OLED device mechanisms, structures and developments. Specific areas in which the Adachi's work was instrumental include highly efficiency phosphorescence emission, OLED host materials and OLED degradation.

In 2012 Adachi discovered a new class of light emitting materials that utilize thermally activated delayed fluorescence, or TADF. Since then his research activities are mainly focused on TADF and Hyperfluorescence OLED emission.

In 2014 the Society for Information Display awarded Adachi with its 2014 SID Fellow Award that honors individuals who have made a widely recognized and significant contribution to the field of information display.

In 2007 Adachi's paper "Relaxation of Roll-off Characteristics in Organic Electrophosphorescence diodes" won the Outstanding Poster Paper Award at the 7th International Meeting on Information Display (IMID2007). In July 2016 Adachi was one of the scientists recognized at the Japan Research Front Awards 2016. The award was organized by the Intellectual Property & Science business of Thomson Reuters. Other awards include the 2003 Funai Foundation for Information Technology FFIT Award, the 2004 distinguished paper award on organic electroluminescence (by the Japan Society of Applied Physics) and the 2004 Nano-Tech Award (IT&Electronics division).

In the 2007 Adachi received the Commendation for Science and Technology by the Japanese Minister of Education, Culture, Sports, Science and Technology. In 2016 Adachi was awarded with the Japan Society of Applied Physics Fellow Award.

In 2019, Adachi became a laureate of the Asian Scientist 100 by the Asian Scientist.

In 2022, Adachi received the 92nd Hattori Hokokai Award and the 38nd Kenjiro Sakurai Memorial Award.

In 2023, Adachi received the prestigious medal of honor with Purple Ribbon from the Japanese government.

== Personal ==
- He was born in Nagano and raised in Tokyo.
- His given name, Chihaya, comes from "Chihayaburu (千早振る)", the waka by Ariwara no Narihira in Hyakunin Isshu.
