= John Pendry =

British physicist

John Brian Pendry FRS HonFInstP
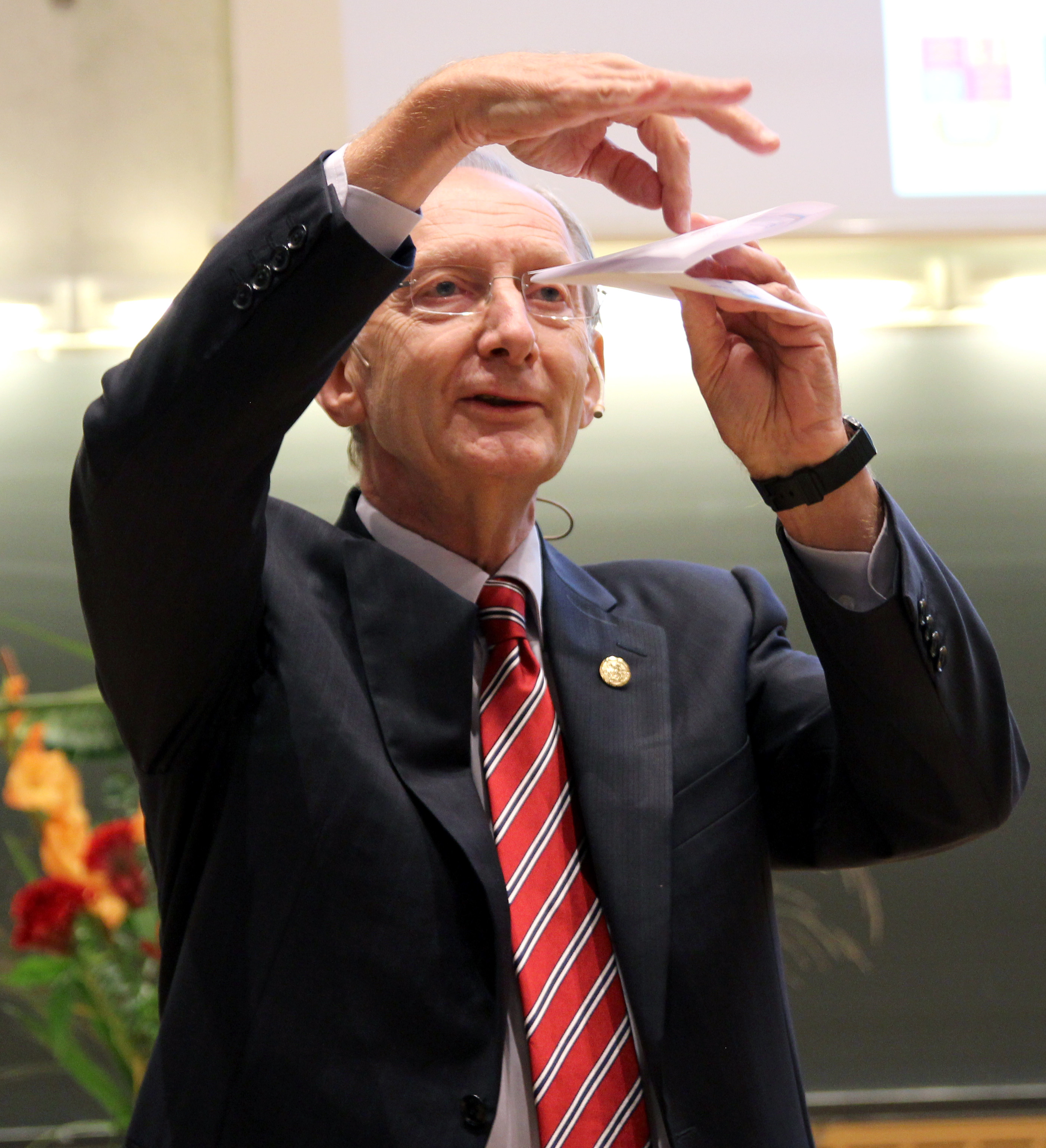
- Pendry in 2014
- Born: 4 July 1943 (age 83)
- Education: Downing College, Cambridge
- Known for: Metamaterials; Metamaterial cloaking; Cloak of invisibility; Superlens; Transformation optics; Spoof surface plasmon
- Awards: Copley Medal (2025); Kyoto Prize in Advanced Technology (2024); Kavli Prize in Nanoscience (2014); Isaac Newton Medal (2013); Royal Medal (2006); Royal Society Bakerian Medal (2005); Knight Bachelor (2004); IOP Dirac Prize (1996); Fellow of the Royal Society (1984)
- Scientific career
- Fields: Physics
- Workplaces: Imperial College London; University of Cambridge; Bell Labs; Daresbury Laboratory
- Thesis: The application of pseudopotentials to low energy electron diffraction (1970)
- Doctoral advisor: Volker Heine
- Website: www3.imperial.ac.uk/people/j.pendry www.cmth.ph.ic.ac.uk/photonics/Newphotonics

Sir John Brian Pendry, FRS HonFInstP (born 4 July 1943) is an English theoretical physicist known for his research into metamaterials and creation of the first practical "Invisibility Cloak". He is a professor of theoretical solid state physics at Imperial College London where he was head of the department of physics (1998–2001) and principal of the faculty of physical sciences (2001–2002). He is an honorary fellow of Downing College, Cambridge, (where he was an undergraduate) and an IEEE fellow. He received the Kavli Prize in Nanoscience "for transformative contributions to the field of nano-optics that have broken long-held beliefs about the limitations of the resolution limits of optical microscopy and imaging.", together with Stefan Hell, and Thomas Ebbesen, in 2014.

== Education ==
Pendry was educated at Downing College, Cambridge, graduating with a Master of Arts degree in Natural Sciences and a PhD in 1969.

== Career ==
John Pendry was born in Manchester, where his father was an oil representative, and took a degree in Natural Sciences at the Downing College, Cambridge after which he was appointed as a research fellow, between 1969 and 1975. He spent time at Bell Labs in 1972–3 and was head of the theory group at the SERC Daresbury Laboratory from 1975 to 1981, when he was appointed to the chair in theoretical physics at Imperial College, London, where he stayed for the rest of his career. Preferring administration to teaching, he was Dean of the Royal College of Science from 1993 to 1996, head of the Physics Department from 1998 to 2001 and Principal of the Faculty of Physical Sciences 2001–2. He has authored over 300 research papers and encouraged many experimental initiatives.

He was elected a Fellow of the Royal Society in 1984 and in 2004 he was knighted in the Birthday Honours. In 2008, an issue of Journal of Physics: Condensed Matter was dedicated to him in honour of his 65th birthday.

He is married to Pat, a mathematician he met at Cambridge who became a tax inspector. They have no children. His hobbies include playing the piano.

== Research ==
Pendry has authored or co-authored a wide range of articles and several books.

Pendry's research career started with his PhD, which was concerned with low-energy electron diffraction (LEED), a technique for examining the surface of materials which had been discovered in the twenties but which waited for Pendry's method of computing the results to become practical. His supervisor, Volker Heine observed that Pendry "is one of the few research students that I have had who did things independently that I could never have done myself". At Bell Labs, Pendry worked with Patrick Lee in photoelectron spectroscopy to develop the first quantitative theory of EXAFS, for which he was awarded the Dirac Prize of the Institute of Physics in 1996.

Pendry noticed that the problem of photoemission was similar to his work on LEED and this was important as the synchrotron at Daresbury was just coming online. As head of the theory group there he published his theory of angle-resolved photoemission which remains the standard model in the field. These methods enabled the band structure of electrons in solids and at surfaces to be determined to unprecedented accuracy and in 1980 he proposed the technique of inverse photoemission which is now widely used for probing unoccupied electron states.

Whilst maintaining his position as the UK's leading theoretical surface physicist, at Imperial he began to study the behaviour of electrons in disordered media and derived a complete solution of the general scattering problem in one dimension and advanced techniques for studying higher dimensions, which are relevant to conductivity of bio-molecules. In 1994 he published his first papers on photonic band structures enabling the interaction of light with metallic systems to be discovered. This led to his invention of the idea of metamaterials. Currently, the idea of metamaterials has evolved from its initial focus on electromagnetic or optical wave systems - the first stage, to other wave systems - the second stage, and has further expanded to diffusion systems - the third stage. The control equations for these three stages are completely different, namely Maxwell equations (a type of wave equation for transverse waves), other wave equations (used to describe both longitudinal and transverse waves), and diffusion equations (used to describe diffusion processes). Therefore, from the perspective of control equations, researchers today can divide the field of metamaterials into three main branches: Electromagnetic/Optical wave metamaterials, other wave metamaterials, and diffusion metamaterials. Diffusion metamaterials are crafted to master various diffusion dynamics, where diffusion length serves as the pivotal measure. This parameter fluctuates over time, yet it does not respond to alterations in frequency. Conversely, wave metamaterials, tailored to modify diverse wave travel patterns, hinge on the wavelength of the incoming waves as their vital measure. Unlike diffusion length, wavelength stays steady over time but varies with frequency changes. At their core, the primary measures of diffusion and wave metamaterials diverge significantly, highlighting a unique complementary connection between the two; more details can be found in Section I.B "Evolution of metamaterial physics" of Ref.

=== Perfect lens ===
An article in Physical Review Letters in 2000 which extended work done by Russian scientist Victor Veselago and suggested a simple method of creating a lens whose focus was theoretically perfect, has become his most cited paper. Initially, it had many critics who could not believe that such a short article could present such a radical idea. However his ideas were confirmed experimentally and the notion of the superlens has revolutionised nanoscale optics.

=== Invisibility cloak ===
In 2006 he came up with the idea of bending light in such a way that it could form a container around an object which effectively makes the object invisible and produced a paper with David R. Smith of Duke University, who demonstrated the idea at the frequency of microwaves. This idea, commonly known as the Invisibility cloak, has stimulated much recent work in the field of metamaterials. In 2009 he and Stefan Maier received a large grant from the Leverhulme Trust to develop the ideas of perfect lens and invisibility cloak in the optical range of light.

== Awards and honours ==
In 2025, Pendry was awarded the Copley Medal of the Royal Society.

In 2024, Pendry was awarded the Kyoto Prize in Advanced Technology in the category of "Material Sciences and engineering".

In 2023, Pendry, Sheldon Schultz and David R. Smith were selected as Clarivate Citation laureates in Physics "for their prediction and discovery of negative refraction."

In 2019, Pendry won the SPIE Mozi Award "in recognition of his eminent contributions to the development of perfect lens"

In 2016, Sir John Pendry was awarded the Dan David Prize.

In 2014, he was a co-recipient of the Kavli Prize in Nanoscience, awarded by the Norwegian Academy of Science and Letters, with Stefan Hell of the Max Planck Institute for Biophysical Chemistry, and Thomas Ebbesen of the University of Strasbourg.

In 2013, he won the Institute of Physics Isaac Newton Medal.

In 1994, he was a recipient of the BVC Medal and Prize, awarded by the British Vacuum Council.
