= Tien-Yien Li =

American mathematician (1945-2020)

- 李天岩
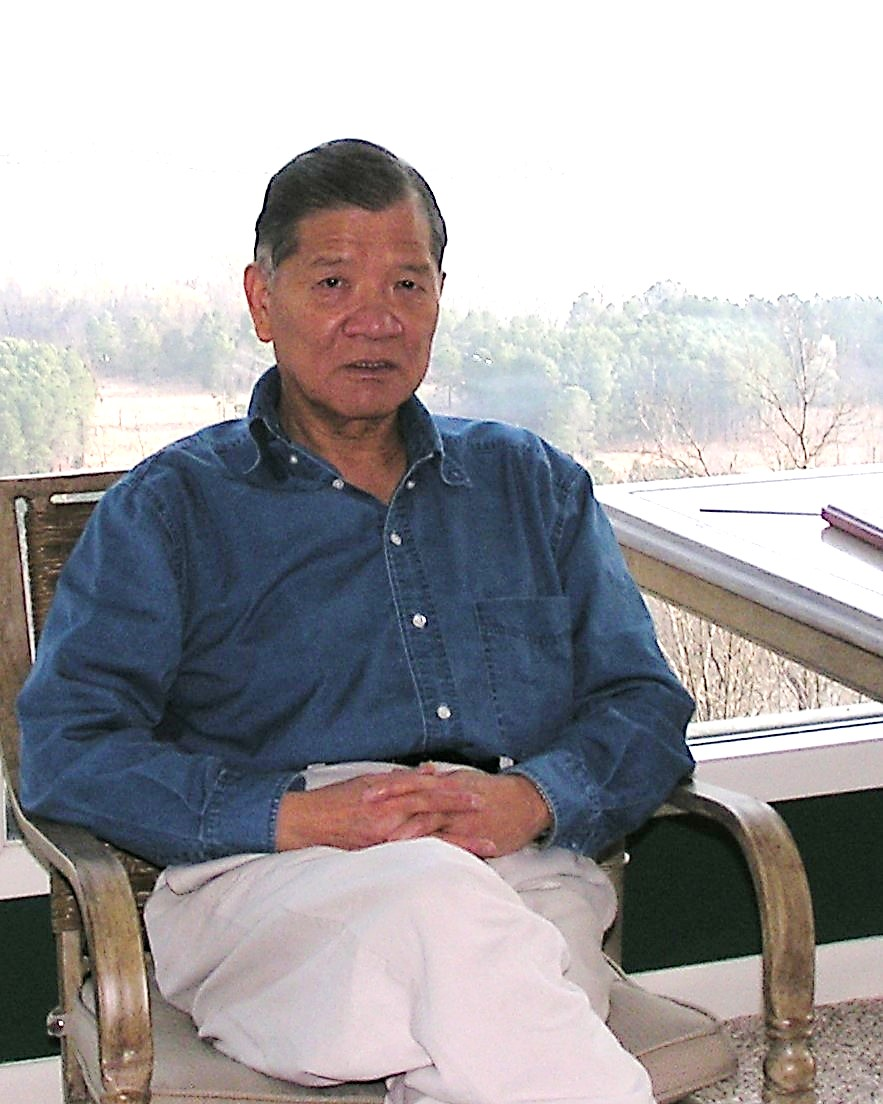
- Born: June 28, 1945; Sha County, Fujian Province, China
- Died: June 25, 2020 (aged 75); Michigan, U.S.
- Education: National Tsing Hua University (BS); University of Maryland, College Park (PhD)
- Awards: Guggenheim Fellowship (1995)
- Scientific career
- Fields: Mathematics
- Workplaces: Michigan State University
- Doctoral advisor: James Yorke

Tien-Yien Li (Chinese: 李天岩; June 28, 1945 – June 25, 2020) was a Taiwanese mathematician. He was a University Distinguished Professor of Mathematics and University Distinguished Professor Emeritus at Michigan State University. There, he spent 42 years and supervised 26 Ph.D. dissertations.

== Early life and education ==
Li was born on June 28, 1945, in Sha County, Fujian Province, China. At age three, he was brought to Taiwan by his parents. He earned his B.S. in mathematics from National Tsing Hua University in 1968. Li received his doctorate in 1974 from University of Maryland under the guidance of James Yorke.

== Academic career ==
Li joined the faculty of the Department of Mathematics at Michigan State University in 1976 and was promoted to the rank of full professor in 1983. He retired as a University Distinguished Professor Emeritus in 2018 after spending 42 years at the university. Li and his supervisor James Yorke published a paper in 1975 entitled Period three implies chaos, in which the mathematical term chaos was coined. He also proved Ulam's conjecture in the field of computation of invariant measures of chaotic dynamical systems. Collaborating with Kellogg and Yorke, Li advanced the application of numerical techniques to the computation of Brouwer's fixed point, contributing significantly to the development of modern Homotopy Continuation methods. Through their collective efforts, abstract mathematical concepts were rendered accessible and practical, fostering new pathways for both theoretical exploration and computational innovation.

== Awards and honors ==
- Guggenheim Fellow, 1995
- Distinguished Faculty Award, College of Natural Science, Michigan State University, 1996.
- Distinguished Faculty Award, Michigan State University, 1996.
- J.S.Frame Teaching Award, 1996.
- University Distinguished Professor, Michigan State University, 1998.
- Distinguished Alumni, College of Sciences, Tsing Hua University, Taiwan, 2002.
- Outstanding Academic Advisor Award, College of Natural Science, Michigan State University, 2006.
- National Tsinghua University's Outstanding Alumni Award, Taiwan, 2012.
