= Suzanne Sindi =

American applied mathematician

Suzanne Soraya Fernandes-Sindi is an American applied mathematician whose research uses mathematics and machine learning to model biological phenomena including prion aggregation, blood coagulation, population dynamics, and structural variation. She is a professor of applied mathematics in the School of Natural Sciences at the University of California, Merced, and the former chair of the Department of Applied Mathematics at UC Merced. She chairs the Equity, Diversity, and Inclusion Activity Group of the Society for Industrial and Applied Mathematics.

== Early life and education ==
Sindi is originally from Placentia, California; her parents were immigrants from Saudi Arabia and from the Azores of Portugal. She describes her interest in mathematical biology as inspired by reading the 1990 novel Jurassic Park as a middle school student. As an undergraduate at California State University, Fullerton, she received a National Science Foundation Graduate Fellowship, funding her graduate study at the University of Maryland, College Park. There, she received a master's degree in 2004 and completed her Ph.D. in 2006. Her doctoral dissertation, Describing and Modeling Repetitive Sequences in DNA, was supervised by James A. Yorke.

== Recognition ==
Sindi was named as a Fellow of the Association for Women in Mathematics, in the 2027 class of fellows, "for her sustained national leadership in advancing women and underrepresented groups in the mathematical sciences through founding Cal-Bridge Mathematics, her stewardship of the Workshops for Women in Mathematical Biology, and her inclusive departmental leadership as Chair of UC Merced Applied Mathematics".
