= Thomas Antonsen =

American physicist

- Born: Thomas Marbory Antonsen Jr. December 7, 1950 (age 75); Hackensack, New Jersey
- Education: Cornell University
- Awards: IEEE John R. Pierce Award (2016); IEEE Marie Sklodowska-Curie Award (2022); James Clerk Maxwell Prize for Plasma Physics (2023)
- Scientific career
- Fields: Plasma physics
- Workplaces: University of Maryland
- Thesis: Theoretical problems in plasma heating (1977)
- Doctoral advisor: Edward Ott

Thomas Marbory Antonsen Jr. (born December 7, 1950) is an American physicist, a Distinguished Professor in the Department of Physics and the Department of Electrical and Computer Engineering at the University of Maryland.

== Early life and career ==
Antonsen graduated from Cornell University with a B.S. degree in electrical engineering in 1973, an M.S. in 1976 and a Ph.D. in 1977.

He was a National Research Council postdoctoral fellow at the Naval Research Laboratory in 1976-77 and a research scientist in the Research Laboratory of Electronics at MIT from 1977 to 1980. He joined the faculty of the University of Maryland in 1980 as a research assistant, where his research interests include nonlinear dynamics and chaos and plasma theory. He was appointed professor at Maryland in 1989.

== Honors and awards ==
Antonsen was elected a Fellow of the American Physical Society in 1986 for "contributions to the theory of the stability of high temperature plasmas and the theory of the production of intense ion beams". He was named a Fellow of the Institute of Electrical and Electronics Engineers (IEEE) in 2012 for "contributions to the theory of magnetically confined plasmas, laser-plasma interactions and high power coherent radiation sources".

Antonsen was awarded the 2016 John Pierce Award for Excellence in Vacuum Electronics from IEEE. He was also awarded the 2022 IEEE Marie Sklodowska-Curie Award and the 2023 James Clerk Maxwell Prize for Plasma Physics from the American Physical Society.

== Personal life ==
Antonsen is married with 3 children.
