= Diffusion metamaterial =

Subset of the metamaterial family

Diffusion metamaterials are a subset of the metamaterial family, which primarily comprises thermal metamaterials, particle diffusion metamaterials, and plasma diffusion metamaterials. Currently, thermal metamaterials play a pivotal role within the realm of diffusion metamaterials. The applications of diffusion metamaterials span various fields, including heat management, chemical sensing, and plasma control, offering capabilities that surpass those of traditional materials and devices.

== History ==
In 1968, Veselago introduced the concept of negative refractive index. Subsequently, John Pendry recognized the potential of using artificial microstructures to achieve unconventional electromagnetic properties. He conducted pioneering research involving metal wire arrays and split ring structures. His groundbreaking contributions ignited a surge of interest in the field of electromagnetic or optical metamaterials. Researchers began to focus on manipulating transverse waves through metamaterials, a concept governed by Maxwell's equations, which serve as wave equations.

In 2000, Ping Sheng unveiled the phenomenon of local resonance in sonic materials, which possess longitudinal wave properties. This discovery expanded the horizons of metamaterial research to encompass other wave systems. This extension included control equations such as the acoustic wave equation and elastic wave equation.

In 2008, Ji-Ping Huang extended the application of metamaterials to thermal diffusion systems. His initial research focused on steady-state heat conduction equations. Using transformation theory, he introduced the concept of thermal cloaking. In 2013, the application of metamaterials was further extended to particle diffusion systems, with the first proposal of particle diffusion cloaking under low diffusivity conditions. Subsequently, in 2022, metamaterials were applied to plasma diffusion systems, where transformation theory was used to design functional devices capable of showcasing several novel phenomena, including cloaking.

Contemporary researchers can categorize the realm of metamaterials into three primary branches, each defined by its governing equations: electromagnetic and optical wave metamaterials which involve Maxwell's equations for transverse waves; other wave metamaterials which involve various wave equations for longitudinal and transverse waves; and diffusion metamaterials which involve the diffusion processes described by diffusion equations. In diffusion metamaterials, which are designed to control a variety of diffusion behaviors, the key measurement is the diffusion length. This metric varies over time yet remains unaffected by frequency changes. On the other hand, wave metamaterials, engineered to alter different modes of wave travel, rely on the wavelength of incoming waves as their critical dimension. This value is constant over time but shifts with frequency. Essentially, the fundamental metric for diffusion metamaterials is distinctly different from that of wave metamaterials, revealing a relationship of complementarity between them.

== Basic theory ==
=== Transformation theory ===
It denotes a theoretical methodology that links spatial geometric structural parameters with physical properties such as thermal conductivity. This is achieved through the application of coordinate transformations between two separate spatial domains. Its roots can be traced back to the realm of transformation optics, originally conceived for wave systems.

=== Diffusion equations ===
Diffusion metamaterials can be crafted by explicitly solving the relevant diffusion equations while considering suitable boundary conditions, such as thermal conduction equations.

=== Effective medium theory ===
Prominent examples of effective medium theories include the Maxwell-Garnett theory and the Bruggeman theory.

=== Scattering cancellation theory ===
This method is proposed based on the cancellation of relevant physical quantities, such as temperature disturbances.

=== Phase transition theory ===
This method relies on various types of phase transitions and can be employed to craft diffusion metamaterials featuring novel properties, such as a zero-energy-consumption thermostat and thermal meta-terrace.

=== Computer simulation ===
It encompasses finite element simulations, machine learning, topology optimization, particle swarm optimization, and similar techniques.

== Characteristic length ==
In accordance with the definition, metamaterials must possess a characteristic length. For example, electromagnetic or optical metamaterials employ incident wavelengths as their characteristic lengths, and their structural elements are (significantly) smaller in size compared to these characteristic lengths. This design principle enables us to gain insights into the unique properties of these artificially engineered materials through the lens of effective medium theory.

Similarly, diffusion metamaterials possess analogous characteristic length scales. Taking thermal metamaterials as an example, the characteristic length for conductive thermal metamaterials is the thermal diffusion length. Convective thermal metamaterials are characterized by the migration length of the fluid, while radiative thermal metamaterials hinge on the wavelength of thermal radiation.

== Applications ==
Diffusion metamaterials have found multiple practical applications. In the field of thermal metamaterials, the thermal cloak structure has been utilized for providing infrared thermal protection in underground shelters. Designs of thermal metamaterials have been used in managing heat in electronic devices, and films with radiative cooling have been used in commercial applications.
