= Sheldon Schultz =

American physicist (1933–2017)

- Schultz in 1972
- Born: January 21, 1933; New York City, U.S.
- Died: January 31, 2017 (aged 84); San Diego, California, U.S.
- Education: Stevens Institute of Technology; Columbia University
- Known for: Metamaterials and negative-index of refraction
- Scientific career
- Fields: Physics
- Workplaces: University of California, San Diego
- Thesis: Cross-sections for the excitation of the metastable 2s state of atomic hydrogen (1960)
- Doctoral advisor: Polykarp Kusch; William Lichten
- Doctoral students: David R. Smith

Sheldon "Shelly" Schultz (January 21, 1933 – January 31, 2017) was an American physicist, who was a professor at University of California, San Diego. Best known for his contributions to the discovery of metamaterials and negative-index media, he served as the Director of the Center for Magnetic Recording Research at UCSD from 1990 to 2000.

== Biography ==
Sheldon Schultz was born on January 21, 1933 in New York City. A graduate of Stuyvesant High School, he received bachelor's degree in mechanical engineering from Stevens Institute of Technology in 1954. He pursued his doctoral studies in physics at Columbia University under the supervision of Polykarp Kusch and William Lichten, receiving his Ph.D. degree in 1960. In the same year, he joined the Department of Physics at University of California, San Diego as one of the founding faculty members. Having received a Sloan Research Fellowship in 1964, he became a full professor in 1971 and continued as a research professor until 2013. He also served as the Director of the Center for Magnetic Recording Research at UCSD from 1990 to 2000. He died at his home in La Jolla on January 31, 2017 from complications due to Parkinson's disease, being survived by his wife, three children and grandchildren. He was a Fellow of the IEEE and American Physical Society, and was the president of the nanotechnology company, Seashell Technology LLC.

Schultz is best known for his work on metamaterials and negative-index of refraction, which he and his research group have demonstrated experimentally in 2000 for microwave frequencies. His work on metamaterials, though controversial at the time, was listed as "Top Ten Breakthroughs in 2003" by journal Science and one of these publications was selected among "PRL Milestones" by Physical Review Letters. In 2009, he was included in the Clarivate Citation Laureates list of potential future winners of the Nobel Prize in Physics along with and John Pendry and David R. Smith, latter of whom was a post-doctoral researcher in Schultz's group. His other work included the design and fabrication of subwavelength antennas, localized surface plasmon-based optical transducers for biochemical and medical applications, and Kerr near-field scanning optical microscopy, as well as applications of magnetic field–modulated microwave spectroscopy and electron paramagnetic resonance.

== Selected publications ==
Journal articles

- Schultz, Sheldon; Dunifer, Gerald (1967). "Observation of spin waves in sodium and potassium". Physical Review Letters. 18 (8): 283–287. doi:10.1103/PhysRevLett.18.283.
- Dalichaouch, Rachida; Armstrong, J. P.; Schultz, S.; Platzman, P. M.; McCall, S. L. (1991). "Microwave localization by two-dimensional random scattering". Nature. 354: 53–55. doi:10.1038/354053a0.
- Schultz, Sheldon; Smith, David R.; Mock, Jack J.; Schultz, David A. (2000). "Single-target molecule detection with nonbleaching multicolor optical immunolabels". Proceedings of the National Academy of Sciences of the United States of America. 97 (3): 996–1001. doi:10.1073/pnas.97.3.996. PMC 15499.
- Smith, D. R.; Padilla, Willie J.; Vier, D. C.; Nemat-Nasser, S. C.; Schultz, S. (2000). "Composite medium with simultaneously negative permeability and permittivity". Physical Review Letters. 84 (18): 4184–4187. doi:10.1103/PhysRevLett.84.4184.
- Shelby, R. A.; Smith, D. R.; Schultz, S. (2001). "Experimental verification of a negative index of refraction". Science. 292 (5514): 77–79. doi:10.1126/science.1058847.
- Shelby, R. A.; Smith, D. R.; Nemat-Nasser, S. C.; Schultz, S. (2001). "Microwave transmission through a two-dimensional, isotropic, left-handed metamaterial". Applied Physics Letters. 78: 489–491. doi:10.1063/1.1343489.
- Mock, J. J.; Barbic, M.; Smith, D. R.; Schultz, D. A.; Schultz, S. (2002). "Shape effects in plasmon resonance of individual colloidal silver nanoparticles". The Journal of Chemical Physics. 116: 6755–6759.
- Smith, David R.; Schurig, David; Rosenbluth, Marshall; Schultz, Sheldon; Ramakrishna, S. Anantha; Pendry, John B. (2003). "Limitations on subdiffraction imaging with a negative refractive index slab". Applied Physics Letters. 82: 1506–1508. arXiv:cond-mat/0206568. doi:10.1063/1.1554779.
- Mock, Jack J.; Smith, David R.; Schultz, Sheldon (2003). "Local refractive index dependence of plasmon resonance spectra from individual nanoparticles". Nano Letters. 3 (4): 485–491. doi:10.1021/nl0340475.
- Smith, D. R.; Schultz, S.; Markoš, P.; Soukoulis, C. M. (2003). "Determination of effective permittivity and permeability of metamaterials from reflection and transmission coefficients". Physical Review B. 65 195104. arXiv:physics/0111203. doi:10.1103/PhysRevB.65.195104.

Patents

- Plasmon resonant particles, methods and apparatus (US20090161104A1)
- Left handed composite media (US20010038325A1)
