= Chitose Institute of Science and Technology =

Technical university in Hokkaido, Japan

Coordinates: 42.793245°N 141.695897°E

- Type: Public
- Established: 1998
- President: Masaaki Kawase
- Undergraduates: 900
- Postgraduates: 60
- Location: Chitose, Hokkaido, Japan
- Campus: Suburban
- Website: www.chitose.ac.jp

The Chitose Institute of Science and Technology (公立千歳科学技術大学, Koritsu Chitose Kagaku Gijutsu Daigaku) is a technical university in Chitose, Hokkaido, Japan. It was established in 1998.
