= David R. Smith (physicist) =

American physicist

David R. Smith is an American physicist and professor of electrical and computer engineering at Duke University in North Carolina and visiting professor at Imperial College London. Smith's research focuses on electromagnetic metamaterials, or materials with a negative index of refraction.

Smith obtained his B.Sc. and Ph.D. in physics from the University of California, San Diego (UCSD) in 1988 and 1994. In 2000, as a postdoctoral fellow working in the laboratory of Professor Sheldon Schultz at UCSD, Smith and his colleagues discovered the first material that exhibited a negative index of refraction.

For his research in metamaterials, Smith, along with four European researchers, was awarded the Descartes Prize in 2005, the European Union's top prize for collaborative research. He is known also as the first person to create a functioning cloak of invisibility that renders an object invisible in microwave wavelengths. Although the cloaking device had limited ability to conceal an object from light of a single microwave wavelength, the experiment was an initial demonstration of the potential of metamaterials, constructed composite materials with unusual optical properties, to behave in unique ways because of both their structural properties.

In 2009, Reuters news service listed Smith in the Clarivate Citation laureates in Physics, which considers potential candidates for the Nobel Prize in Physics.
