= Thermally activated delayed fluorescence =

Heat-activated light emission

Thermally activated delayed fluorescence (TADF) is a process through which surrounding thermal energy changes population of excited states of molecular compounds and thus, alters light emission. The TADF process usually involves an excited molecular species in a triplet state, which commonly has a forbidden transition to the singlet ground state, termed phosphorescence. By absorbing nearby thermal energy, the triplet state can undergo reverse intersystem crossing (RISC) converting the triplet state population to an excited singlet state, which then emits light to the singlet ground state in a delayed process termed delayed fluorescence. Accordingly, in many cases, the TADF molecules show two types of emission, a delayed fluorescence and a prompt fluorescence. This is found for specific organic molecules, but also for selected organo-transition metal compounds, such as Cu(I) complexes. Along with traditional organic fluorescent molecules and phosphorescent organo-transition metal complexes, TADF compounds belong to the three main light-emitting material groups used in organic light-emitting diodes (OLEDs).

== History ==
The first evidence of thermally activated delayed fluorescence in an organic molecule was discovered in 1961 investigating the compound eosin. The emission detected was termed "E-type" delayed fluorescence, but the mechanism was not completely understood. In 1986, this mechanism was further investigated and described in detail using aromatic thiones, but a practical use was only identified much later.

Application of the TADF mechanism for efficient light generation in OLEDs was proposed in 2008 by Yersin and coworkers and subsequently intensively studied. Originally the corresponding mechanism was designated as "singlet harvesting mechanism". Since 2009, the mechanism was extensively investigated by Chihaya Adachi and coworkers as well as by other research groups. A series of papers were published, reporting effective TADF molecular design strategies focusing on different TADF compounds. Extensive studies of green, orange, and blue emitting OLEDs based on organic TADF materials spiked interest in the TADF field. This mechanism was soon considered as possible high efficiency alternative to traditional fluorescent and also phosphorescent compounds used in lighting displays so far. TADF materials are being considered the third generation of OLEDs following fluorescent and phosphorescent based devices.

== Mechanism ==
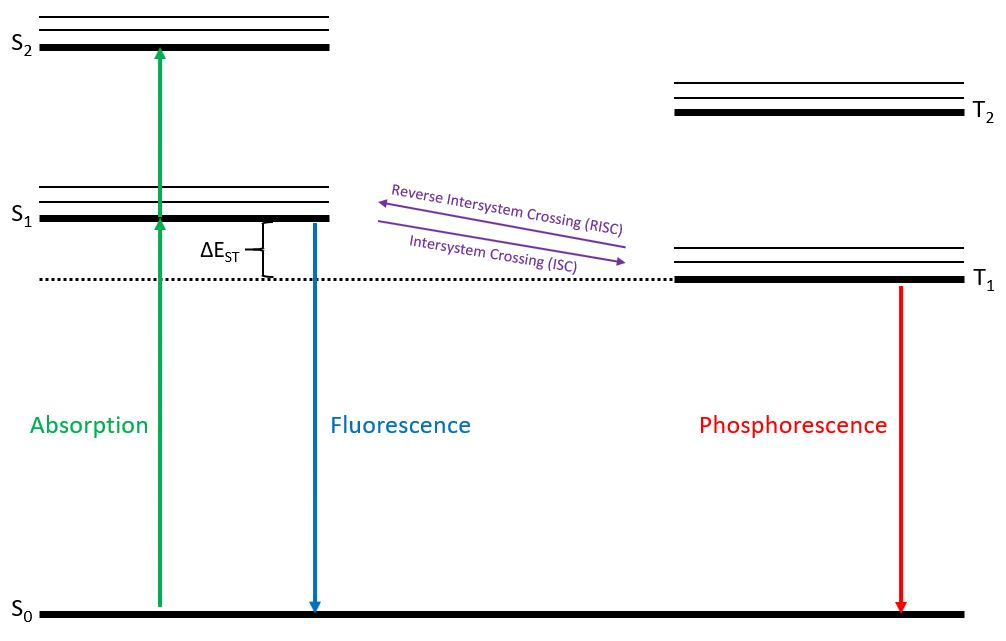
Photoluminescence pathways and associated energy levels

The steps of the TADF mechanism are displayed in the figure at right (where it is assumed that the ground state is a singlet state, which is usually but not always the case). In the electroluminescent process, which is observed in OLEDs, an electrical excitation leads to population of singlet and triplet states of the TADF molecules. From the singlet state an allowed transition can occur to the electronic singlet ground state on a time scale of 10 to 100 nanoseconds for organic TADF molecules. This emission represents the prompt fluorescence. Principally, the electron can undergo a forbidden de-excitation to the ground state as a radiative transition, called phosphorescence, or as a non-radiative process. However, this occurs on a much slower time scale, being on the order of microseconds to seconds. However, in suitable cases, thermal activation from the triplet to the excited singlet state, the reverse intersystem crossing, can populate the singlet state in a fast process by quenching the triplet state population. As a consequence, delayed fluorescence is observed. Accordingly, when a TADF material becomes electronically excited, it exhibits prompt fluorescence and delayed fluorescence, usually occurring at (almost) the same wavelength. Selected organo-transition metal compounds can show both TADF and relatively fast phosphorescence.

In an OLED based on traditional fluorescent materials only harvesting of the singlet state population is possible. Thus, due to spin statistics only 25% of the excitation can be exploited. On the other hand, both specific phosphorescent and TADF materials have the ability to harvest the excitation from both singlet and triplet states, theoretically allowing these materials to convert close to 100% of the electrically generated excitons, giving them a large advantage over traditional fluorescent-based materials. However, due to light out-coupling losses in OLED devices, the external quantum efficiency (EQE) is, without employing specific out-coupling enhancement strategies, substantially lower, lying slightly above 5% and 20%, respectively.

=== OLEDs, excitons, spin statistics, and electroluminescence ===
An OLED device consists of a cathode and an anode and in between a number of layers that guarantee optimized electron transport (from the cathode) and hole transport (from the anode) toward the emission layer, where the emitter molecules are doped in a host matrix. The figure shown displays schematically a simplified OLED device structure. Usually, other layers are applied, such as electron and hole injection layers as well as electron and hole blocking layers, respectively, to confine both electrons and holes to the emission layer (EML). For high-performance OLEDs, an optimized charge carrier balance should be achieved. The thickness of the different layers adds up to only several hundred nanometers.

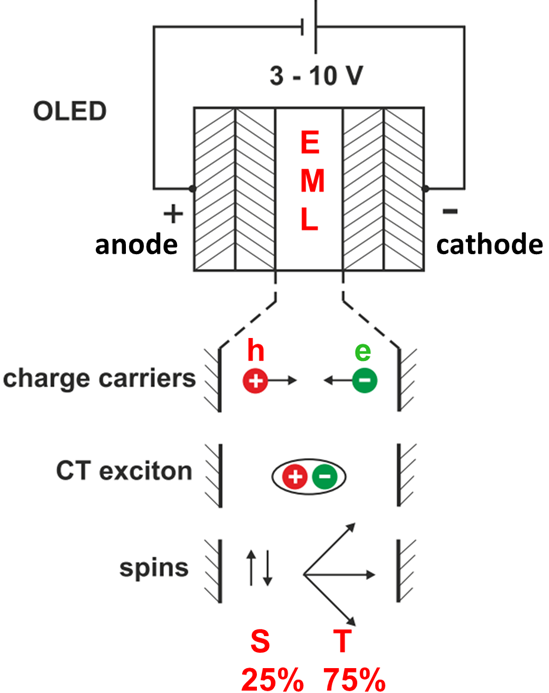
Schematic and simplified OLED structure. In the emission layer (EML), electrons (e) and holes (h) attract each other by long-range Coulomb interaction. Coupling of the spins of hole and electron leads to singlet (S) and triplet (T) excitons in a ratio of 25% to 75%.

Both electron and hole attract each other by long-range Coulomb forces even up to a separation of around 15 nm. The bound electron-hole pairs represent the excitons. Very frequently, one of the charge carriers, hole or electron, is trapped at the emitter molecule, while attracting the opposite charge. In this situation, the exciton represents a charge transfer (CT) exciton. Each charge carrier carries a spin and both spins couple via their magnetic moments. Due to quantum mechanical rules, the spins can combine in four different ways: in an antiparallel orientation, giving a singlet S with a multiplicity of 1, and three different parallel orientations, giving a triplet T with multiplicity of 3 (see the figure). For an ensemble of charge carriers, electrons (e) and holes (h) couple according to the following rule:

4(e + h) = 1 S + 3 T

Thus, spin-statistics results in 25% singlet excitons and 75% triplet excitons. In other words, the corresponding exciton states, ^{1}CT(exciton) and ^{3}CT(exciton), are populated accordingly. Subsequently, fast spin-allowed radiationless relaxation, occurring within the respective singlet and triplet manifold of states, leads to population of the energetically lowest excited singlet and triplet states of the emitter molecule. As a consequence, regarding an ensemble of doped emitter molecules electrical excitation results in 25% excited singlet states and in 75% triplet states. Finally, properties of these emitter molecules do not only determine emission color, luminescence quantum yield, emission decay time, etc., but they are crucially responsible for harvesting the singlet as well as the triplet excitons. In other words, the population of the different exciton spin states should relax to the lowest excited states of the doped molecules and then be transferred into light, representing the electroluminescence. However, this does not occur for all luminescent molecules, even if they show almost 100% photoluminescence quantum yield, because, for example, exciton harvesting is incomplete. Thus, only specific molecules can guarantee maximum exploitation of all singlet and triplet excitations. This can be realized with phosphorescent metal complexes or TADF molecules.

=== Factors affecting TADF ===
Several key kinetic properties of TADF materials determine their ability to efficiently generate light through delayed fluorescence, while minimizing thermal loss pathways. The rates of intersystem crossing (ISC), referred to as k_{ISC}, and of reverse intersystem crossing (RISC), given by k_{RISC}, both determined by spin-orbit coupling, should be as fast as possible. In particular, k_{RISC} should be faster than the rates of non-radiative triplet relaxation pathways. Most non-radiative triplet pathways like triplet-triplet annihilation, triplet quenching, or thermal decay occur on the order of microseconds or longer, which usually is long compared to the RISC time. Thus, under suitable conditions, singlet state population is faster.

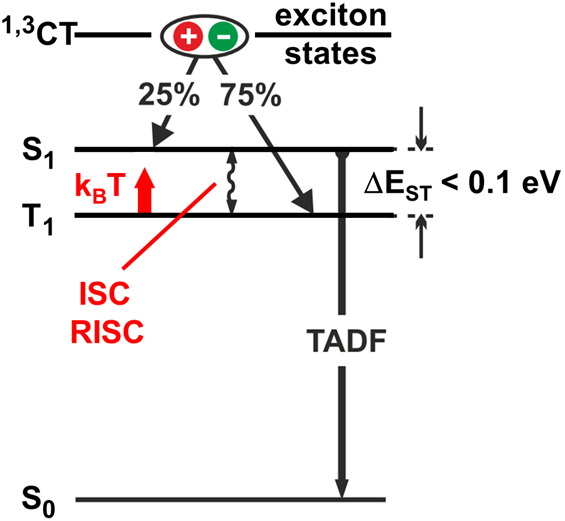
Energy level scheme of TADF molecules and relaxation paths from the ^{1,3}CT exciton states. The ΔE_{ST} value is given for rough orientation. kBT represents the thermal energy that is available. ISC and RISC stand for intersystem crossing and reverse intersystem crossing, respectively.

Another key property is the energy difference between the singlet and triplet states ΔE_{ST}. In particular, as k_{RISC} depends exponentially on this energy gap, it should be small, that is smaller than a few times the thermal energy available at ambient temperature (≈25.6 meV) to effectively allow for fast reverse intersystem crossing. Minimization of this energy gap is thus, considered to be one of the most important strategies in synthesizing potential TADF materials. The most effective strategies employed so far to synthesize TADF molecules are based on donor and acceptor moieties spaced apart or twisted with respect to each other. This effectively reduces the energy gap ΔE_{ST}.

Moreover, the TADF decay time, representing another key parameter, should be as short as possible in order to reduce unwanted chemical reactions during excited state population. This represents a further challenge and requires specific molecular design strategies.

== Chemical structures ==
Chemical structure of TADF material 4CzIPN

The chemical structures of many commonly used TADF materials reflect the requirement to minimize the ΔE_{ST} by displaying a twisted structure. One of the most commonly used and successful TADF materials, 2,4,5,6-tetra(9H-carbazol-9-yl)isophthalonitrile (4CzIPN), contains this type of structure as the bottom and top carbazole groups can be viewed as flat and coplanar while the bottom left and bottom right carbazole groups can be thought of as coming into and out of the page. This type of molecule contains electron donating and electron accepting moieties showing small orbital overlap between the highest occupied molecular orbital (HOMO) and the lowest unoccupied molecular orbital (LUMO). As a consequence, small singlet-triplet splitting, small ΔE_{ST}, is resulting.

Many highly efficient TADF materials contain multiple carbazole groups as electron donors and, for example, incorporate electron acceptors, like triazines, sulfoxides, benzophenones, and spiro-based groups. The table below shows several examples of these compounds that have been reported to yield high efficiencies and relatively small ΔE_{ST}.

High Efficiency TADF Compounds
Chemical Name	Photoluminescence wavelength (nm)	Electroluminescence wavelength (nm)	ΔE_{ST} (eV)	Device Efficiency, EQE (%)
34TCzPN	448	475	0.16	21.8
DMAC-TRZ	495	495	0.046	26.5
Ac-MPM	489	489	0.19	24.5
DMAC-DPS	465	476	0.08	19.5
DTCBPy	518	514	0.04	27.2
ACRSA	485	490	0.04	16.5
POB-PZX	482	503	0.028	22.1
PXZ-Mes_{3}B	507	502	0.071	22.8

In a recent design strategy, electron donating and accepting moieties are separated by two bridges, leading to the DSH molecule. For this molecule, extremely small orbital overlap between HOMO and LUMO is resulting. Thus, ultra-small energy gap ΔE_{ST} between the lowest excited singlet and triplet states of only about 1 meV is obtained. For this specific molecule, an ultra-short emission decay time, lying in the sub-microsecond time range, is attained. An OLED device fabricated, shows EQE of ≈ 19%.

Chemical structure of the DSH molecule for OLED application showing ultra-small energy gap ΔE_{ST} and ultra-fast emission decay time.

A number of organo-transition metal complexes, for example, based on Cu(I), Ag(I), Au(I), Au(III) metal centers, exhibit also distinct TADF behavior. In particular, Cu(I) compounds synthesized with different ligands display a wide range of ΔE_{ST} values, extending from around 33 to 160 meV. The depicted Cu(I) compound shows an example.

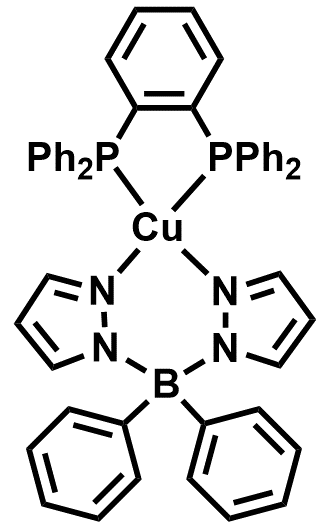
Chemical structure of a Cu(I) complex displaying distinct TADF behavior, shown as an example.

Systematic photophysical including theoretical studies of a large number of Cu(I) compounds result in a detailed understanding of TADF properties. In particular, it is shown that the TADF decay time is not only given by the energy gap ΔE_{ST}, but also by the singlet excited state to the singlet ground state transition rate. Moreover, variation of spin-orbit coupling, as realized by chemical change, enables modification of ISC and reverse ISC rates as well as tuning in of phosphorescence in addition to TADF emission.

Furthermore, it is referred to recent investigations with two-coordinate carbene-M(I)-amide complexes with M(I) = Cu(I), Ag(I), and Au(I). These compounds exhibit short-lived TADF at high emission quantum yield. Even robust materials for OLEDs showing long operational device live time (LT_{90} > 1000 hours at 1000 cd m^{−2}) were reported.

== Applications ==
=== Organic LEDs ===
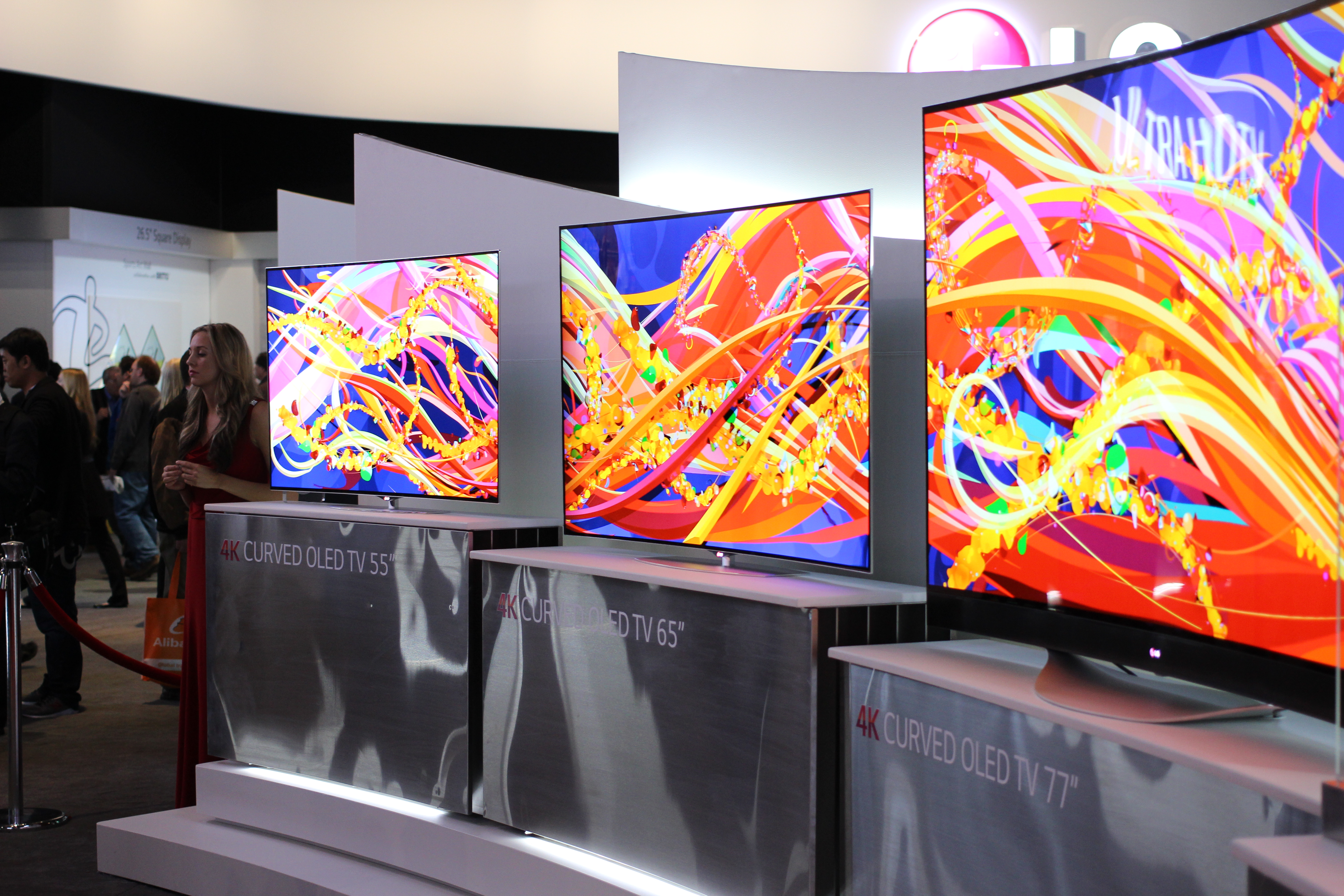
LG 4K Curved OLED TV

The vast majority of research on TADF-based materials is focused on improving the efficiency and lifetime of TADF-based OLEDs. Organic light-emitting diodes or OLEDs have provided an alternative to traditional liquid-crystal displays (LCD) due to the improved contrast, response time, wider viewing angle, and the possibility of fabricating flexible displays. Most OLEDs that are currently commercially available employ phosphorescent organo-transition metal emitters, belonging to the second OLED generation emitters. They have the advantage of high operational lifetime for red and green emission color, however, poor lifetimes are still found for blue emitter materials. Thus, for generation of blue light, traditional organic molecules are applied.

Frequently, it is considered that TADF-based OLEDs may represent the third generation of OLEDs. However, the vast majority of research on TADF-based materials is still focusing on improving efficiency, operational device lifetime, and color purity, though first OLED displays that use TADF emitters are already on the market. These devices are based on TADF emitters combined with color-pure fluorescent organic emitters. The TADF materials harvest efficiently all electrically excited excitons. They represent donors for efficient radiationless energy transfer to fluorescent acceptors, which finally emit light. The corresponding mechanism was named hyperfluorescence.

=== Fluorescence imaging ===
TADF-based materials have a unique advantage in some imaging techniques because of their longer emission lifetimes than materials that show prompt fluorescence. For instance, the TADF exhibiting molecule ACRFLCN shows a strong sensitivity towards triplet oxygen making it an effective molecular oxygen sensor. The fluorescein derivative DCF-MPYM has shown success in the field of bioimaging as its long lifetime allows time-resolved fluorescence imaging in living cells. These tailored organic compounds are especially promising in bioimaging applications because of their low cytotoxicity compared to traditional compounds like lanthanide complexes.

=== Mechanoluminescence ===
TADF compounds can also be synthesized to exhibit a tunable color change based on the macroscopic particle size in powder form. In these compounds, color shift of light emission through mechanical grinding can occur, a phenomenon termed mechanoluminescence. Specifically, asymmetric compounds with diphenyl sulfoxide and phenothiazine moieties have been synthesized displaying linearly tuneable mechanochromism due to a combination of fluorescence and TADF. The compound named SCP shows dual emission peaks in its photoluminescence spectrum and changes from a green to blue color through mechanical grinding.

== Challenges ==
Research of TADF materials has provided impressive results and devices made with these compounds have already achieved good device performance with high quantum efficiencies. However, the synthesis and application of TADF materials still has multiple challenges to overcome before they become commercially viable. Likely the biggest hurdle is the difficulty in producing a blue light emitting TADF molecules with a reasonable operational lifetime. Fabrication of long operational lifetime of blue light emitting OLEDs is a challenge not only for TADF, but also for phosphorescent materials. This is due degradation pathways at the high energy of blue light. Another difficulty in producing efficient TADF materials is the lack of sufficient knowledge concerning detailed structure-property relations for rational molecular design. Though, the combination of donating and accepting groups and the twisted or bridged molecular structure type already provide good fundamental starting concepts for new material concepts.

== See also ==
- Fluorescence
- Phosphorescence
- OLED
- Light-emitting diode
- Singlet state
- Triplet state
- Intersystem crossing
