= Nature Reviews Physics =

- Discipline: Physics
- Language: English
- Edited by: Iulia Georgescu

Publication details
- History: 2019–present
- Publisher: Nature Portfolio
- Frequency: Monthly
- Impact factor: 46.6 (2025)

Standard abbreviations
- ISO 4: Nat. Rev. Phys.

Indexing
- CODEN: NRPACZ
- ISSN: 2522-5820
- OCLC no.: 1082146179

Links
- Journal homepage; Online archive

Nature Reviews Physics is a monthly peer-reviewed scientific journal published by Nature Portfolio. It was established in 2019 as an online-only journal. The chief editor is Nina Meinzer.

== Scope ==
The journal publishes reviews, perspective, roadmap, technical review, expert recommendation, comment, year in review, viewpoint, and feature in all areas of fundamental and applied physics. Specific topics of interest include, but are not limited to:

- Atomic, molecular and optical physics
- Biophysics
- Condensed matter and materials physics
- Fluid dynamics
- General physics
- Gravitation, cosmology and astrophysics
- High-energy physics (particles and fields, accelerators and beams)
- Mathematical physics
- Networks
- Nonlinear dynamics
- Nuclear physics
- Photonics
- Physical chemistry
- Plasma physics
- Polymers and soft matter
- Quantum mechanics, information and technologies
- Software and data analysis
- Statistical physics
- Techniques and instrumentation
- Physics and society, and history of physics

== Impact factor ==
According to the Journal Citation Reports, the journal has a 2025 impact factor of 46.6, ranking it 1st out of 191 journals in the category "Physics, Applied" and 2nd out of 112 journals in the category "Physics, Multidisciplinary".
