= Control of chaos =

Stabilization, by means of small system perturbations, of unstable periodic orbits

In lab experiments that study chaos theory, approaches designed to control chaos are based on certain observed system behaviors. Any chaotic attractor contains an infinite number of unstable, periodic orbits. Chaotic dynamics, then, consists of a motion where the system state moves in the neighborhood of one of these orbits for a while, then falls close to a different unstable, periodic orbit where it remains for a limited time and so forth. This results in a complicated and unpredictable wandering over longer periods of time.

Control of chaos is the stabilization, by means of small system perturbations, of one of these unstable periodic orbits. The result is to render an otherwise chaotic motion more stable and predictable, which is often an advantage. The perturbation must be tiny compared to the overall size of the attractor of the system to avoid significant modification of the system's natural dynamics.

Several techniques have been devised for chaos control, but most are developments of two basic approaches: the Ott–Grebogi–Yorke (OGY) method and Pyragas continuous control. Both methods require a previous determination of the unstable periodic orbits of the chaotic system before the controlling algorithm can be designed.

== OGY method ==
Edward Ott, Celso Grebogi and James A. Yorke were the first to make the key observation that the infinite number of unstable periodic orbits typically embedded in a chaotic attractor could be taken advantage of for the purpose of achieving control by means of applying only very small perturbations. After making this general point, they illustrated it with a specific method, since called the Ott–Grebogi–Yorke (OGY) method of achieving stabilization of a chosen unstable periodic orbit. In the OGY method, small, wisely chosen, kicks are applied to the system once per cycle, to maintain it near the desired unstable periodic orbit.

To start, one obtains information about the chaotic system by analyzing a slice of the chaotic attractor. This slice is a Poincaré section. After the information about the section has been gathered, one allows the system to run and waits until it comes near a desired periodic orbit in the section. Next, the system is encouraged to remain on that orbit by perturbing the appropriate parameter. When the control parameter is actually changed, the chaotic attractor is shifted and distorted somewhat. If all goes according to plan, the new attractor encourages the system to continue on the desired trajectory. One strength of this method is that it does not require a detailed model of the chaotic system but only some information about the Poincaré section. It is for this reason that the method has been so successful in controlling a wide variety of chaotic systems.

The weaknesses of this method are in isolating the Poincaré section and in calculating the precise perturbations necessary to attain stability.

== Pyragas method ==
In the Pyragas method of stabilizing a periodic orbit, an appropriate continuous controlling signal is injected into the system, whose intensity is practically zero as the system evolves close to the desired periodic orbit but increases when it drifts away from the desired orbit. Both the Pyragas and OGY methods are part of a general class of methods called "closed loop" or "feedback" methods which can be applied based on knowledge of the system obtained through solely observing the behavior of the system as a whole over a suitable period of time. The method was proposed by Lithuanian physicist Kęstutis Pyragas.

== Applications ==
Experimental control of chaos by one or both of these methods has been achieved in a variety of systems, including turbulent fluids, oscillating chemical reactions, magneto-mechanical oscillators and cardiac tissues. attempt the control of chaotic bubbling with the OGY method and using electrostatic potential as the primary control variable.

Forcing two systems into the same state is not the only way to achieve synchronization of chaos. Both control of chaos and synchronization constitute parts of cybernetical physics, a research area on the border between physics and control theory.
