= Cees Dekker =

Dutch physicist (born 1959)

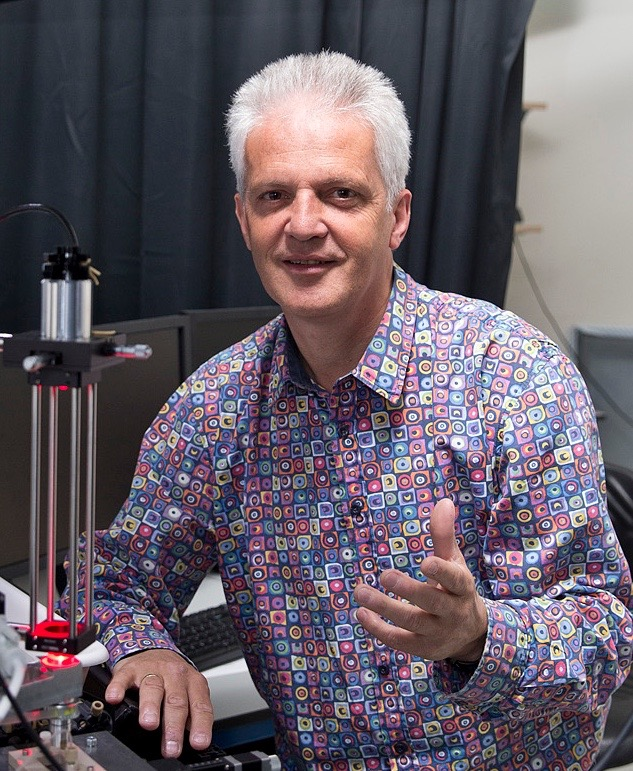
- Cees Dekker
- Born: Cornelis Dekker; 7 April 1959 (age 66); Haren, Groningen
- Awards: Spinoza Prize (2003); EPS Europhysics Prize (2001)
- Scientific career
- Fields: Biophysics; Molecular electronics Nanobiology; Nanotechnology
- Institutions: Delft University of Technology

Cornelis "Cees" Dekker (born 7 April 1959 in Haren, Groningen) is a Dutch physicist, and Distinguished University Professor at Delft University of Technology. He is known for his research on carbon nanotubes, single-molecule biophysics, and nanobiology.

== Biography ==
Born in Haren, Groningen in 1959, Dekker studied at University of Utrecht, where he received a PhD in Experimental Physics in 1988.

In 1988 Dekker started his academic career as Assistant Professor at the University of Utrecht; in these years he also worked in the United States as Visiting Researcher at IBM Research. It was during this period that Dekker carried out research on magnetic spin systems and on noise in superconductors and semiconductors.

In 1993 he was appointed as Associate Professor at Delft University of Technology. In the mid-1990s Dekker and his team achieved success with the discovery of the electronic properties of carbon nanotubes, the first single-molecule transistor and other nanoscience.

In 1999 he was appointed to the Antoni van Leeuwenhoek Professorship, a chair for outstanding young scientists. In 2000, he was appointed in a regular full professorship in Molecular Biophysics at the Faculty of Applied Sciences at Delft. In 2007, he was appointed as a Distinguished University Professor at Delft. From 2010 to 2012, he was the inaugurating Chair of a new Department of Bionanoscience at the Delft University. From 2010 until 2018, Dekker acted as the Director of the Kavli Institute of Nanoscience at Delft. From 2015 until 2020 he was Royal Academy Professor of the Royal Netherlands Academy of Arts and Sciences.

Dekker has been awarded a number of national and international prizes, including the 2001 Agilent Europhysics Prize, the 2003 Spinozapremie, the 2012 Nanoscience Prize, and the 2021 Nano Research Award. He also was granted an honorary doctorate from Hasselt University, Belgium.

In recognition of his achievements, Dekker was elected Member of the Royal Netherlands Academy of Arts and Sciences in 2003, Fellow of the American Physical Society and the Institute of Physics and in 2014 he was awarded Knight of the Order of the Netherlands Lion.

== Work ==
Dekker started his research on single carbon nanotubes in 1993 when he set up a new line of research to study electrical transport through single organic molecules between nanoelectrodes. In 1996 a breakthrough was realized with carbon nanotubes. This was achieved in a collaboration with the group of Nobel laureate Richard Smalley. STM and nanolithography techniques were used to demonstrate that these nanotubes are quantum wires at the single-molecule level, with outstanding physical properties. Many new phenomena were discovered, and he and his research group established a leading position in this field of research. Dekker and his research group discovered new physics of nanotubes as well as explored the feasibility of molecular electronics. In 1998, they were the first to build a transistor based on a single nanotube molecule.

Since 2000, Dekker has shifted the main focus of his work towards biophysics where he studies the properties of single biomolecules and cells using the tools of nanotechnology. This change of field was driven by his fascination for the remarkable functioning of biological molecular structures, as well as by the long-term perspective that many interesting discoveries can be expected in this field. Current lines of research in his biophysics group are in the areas of:

- Nanopores for sequencing of DNA and proteins
- Biophysics of chromatin maintenance
- Bottom up biology, working towards synthetic cells

Dekker has more than 400 publications, including more than 30 papers in Nature and Science. Thirteen of his group's publications have been cited more than 1000 times, and in 2001, his group work was selected as Breakthrough of the Year by the journal Science.

=== Other interests ===
Dekker is a Christian and active in the discussion about the relationship between science and religion, a topic on which he has co-edited several books. In 2005 Dekker became involved in Netherlands-wide discussions about Intelligent Design, a movement that he has since clearly distanced himself from. Dekker advocates that science and religion are not in opposition but can be harmonized.

He wrote the foreword to the Dutch translation of ‘The Language of God' by Francis Collins, the former director of the National Institutes of Health. Like Collins, Dekker is a proponent of theistic evolution. He actively debates with creationists in the Netherlands. In 2015 he co-wrote a children's book that explained an evolutionary creation to young children. This got translated in English as 'Science Geek Sam and his Secret Logbook'. He also co-wrote 'Dawn: A Proton's Tale of All That Came to Be', a book that combines the scientific narrative about the evolution of the cosmos with the Christian creation story.
