= Celso Grebogi =

Brazilian theoretical physicist (born 1947)

Celso Grebogi FRSE
- Born: 1947 (age 78–79); Brazil
- Education: Federal University of Paraná; Pontifical Catholic University of Rio; University of Maryland; University of California, Berkeley; University of São Paulo; University of Aberdeen
- Scientific career
- Fields: Math and Physics (theoretical)
- Workplaces: University of Maryland, College Park

Celso Grebogi FRSE (born 1947) is a Brazilian theoretical physicist who works in the area of chaos theory. He is one among the pioneers in the nonlinear and complex systems and chaos theory. Currently he works at the University of Aberdeen as the "Sixth Century Chair in Nonlinear and Complex Systems". He has done extensive research in the field of plasma physics before his work on the theory of dynamical systems. He and his colleagues (Edward Ott and James A. Yorke) have shown with a numerical example that one can convert a chaotic attractor to any one of numerous possible attracting time-periodic motions by making only small time-dependent perturbations of an available system parameter. This article is considered as one among the classic works in the control theory of chaos and their control method is known as the OGY method. He was listed in the 2016 Thomson Reuters Citation Laureates.

He taught at the Institute of Physics of the University of São Paulo and at the Pontifical Catholic University of Rio de Janeiro.

== Research areas ==
Grebogi has worked in the fields of dynamics of nonlinear and complex systems including chaotic dynamics, fractal geometry, systems biology, fluid advection and relativistic quantum chaotic dynamics.

== Edited books ==
Together with Miguel A. F. Sanjuán (Rey Juan Carlos University, Spain) he was the editor of the book Recent Progress In Controlling Chaos.

== Honours and awards ==
In 2012 Grebogi was elected a Fellow of the Royal Society of Edinburgh.
