= James A. Yorke =

Mathematician and physicist

James Alan Yorke
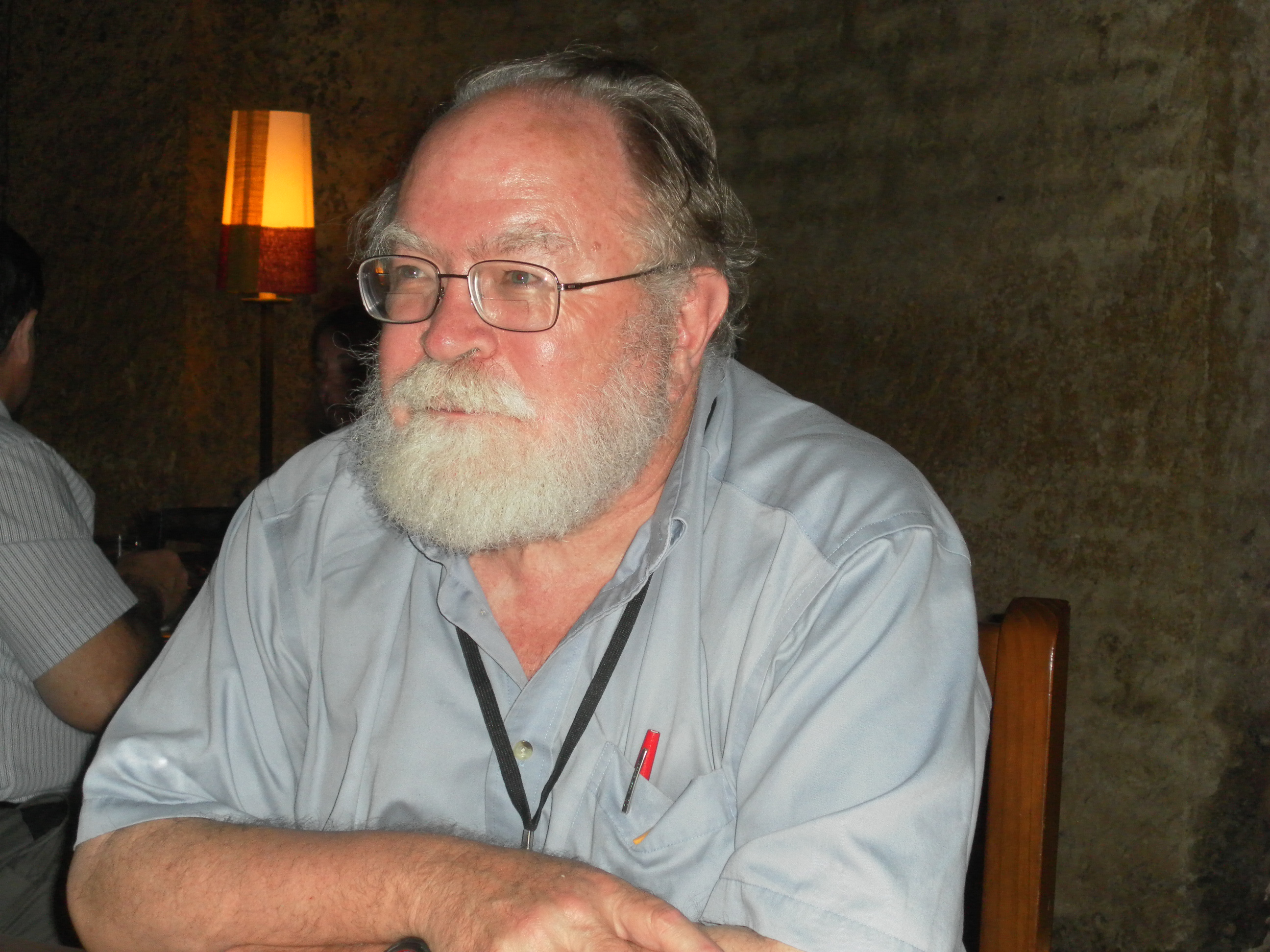
- Born: James Alan Yorke; August 3, 1941 (age 85); Plainfield, New Jersey
- Education: Columbia University (BA) University of Maryland, College Park (PhD)
- Known for: Kaplan–Yorke conjecture
- Awards: Japan Prize (2003)
- Scientific career
- Fields: Math and Physics (theoretical)
- Institutions: University of Maryland, College Park
- Doctoral students: Tien-Yien Li; Suzanne Sindi

James Alan Yorke (born August 3, 1941) is an American mathematician who is a Distinguished University Research Professor of Mathematics and Physics and former chair of the Mathematics Department at the University of Maryland, College Park.

== Life and career ==
Born in Plainfield, New Jersey, United States, Yorke attended The Pingry School, then located in Hillside, New Jersey. He received his PhD at the University of Maryland College Park in 1966, under the supervision of Aaron Strauss. in Yorke is now a Distinguished University Research Professor of Mathematics and Physics with the Institute for Physical Science and Technology at the University of Maryland. In June 2013, Yorke retired as chair of the University of Maryland's Math department. He devotes his university efforts to collaborative research in chaos theory and genomics.

He and Benoit Mandelbrot were the recipients of the 2003 Japan Prize in Science and Technology: Yorke was selected for his work in chaotic systems. In 2003 he was elected a Fellow of the American Physical Society, and in 2012 became a fellow of the American Mathematical Society.

He received the Doctor Honoris Causa degree from the Universidad Rey Juan Carlos, Madrid, Spain, in January 2014. In June 2014, he received the Doctor Honoris Causa degree from Le Havre University, Le Havre, France. He was a 2016 Thomson Reuters Citations Laureate in Physics.

== Contributions ==
=== Period three implies chaos ===
He and his co-author T.Y. Li coined the mathematical term chaos in a paper they published in 1975 entitled Period three implies chaos, in which it was proved that every one-dimensional continuous map

F: R → R

that has a period-3 orbit must have two properties:

(1) For each positive integer p, there is a point in R that returns to where it started after p applications of the map and not before.

This means there are infinitely many periodic points (any of which may or may not be stable): different sets of points for each period p. This turned out to be a special case of Sharkovskii's theorem.

The second property requires some definitions. A pair of points x and y is called “scrambled” if as the map is applied repeatedly to the pair, they get closer together and later move apart and then get closer together and move apart, etc., so that they get arbitrarily close together without staying close together. The analogy is to an egg being scrambled forever, or to typical pairs of atoms behaving in this way. A set S is called a scrambled set if every pair of distinct points in S is scrambled. Scrambling is a kind of mixing.

(2) There is an uncountably infinite set S that is scrambled.

A map satisfying Property 2 is sometimes called "chaotic in the sense of Li and Yorke". Property 2 is often stated succinctly as their article's title phrase "Period three implies chaos". The uncountable set of chaotic points may, however, be of measure zero (see for example the article Logistic map), in which case the map is said to have unobservable nonperiodicity or unobservable chaos.

=== O.G.Y. control method ===
He and his colleagues (Edward Ott and Celso Grebogi) had shown with a numerical example that one can convert a chaotic motion into a periodic one by a proper time-dependent perturbation of the parameter. This article is considered a classic among the works in the control theory of chaos, and their control method is known as the O.G.Y. method.

=== Books ===
Together with Kathleen T. Alligood and Tim D. Sauer, he was the author of the book Chaos: An Introduction to Dynamical Systems.
