= EPS Europhysics Prize =

Condensed matter physics award

The EPS CMD Europhysics Prize is awarded since 1975 by the Condensed Matter Division of the European Physical Society, in recognition of recent work (completed in the 5 years preceding the attribution of the award) by one or more individuals, for scientific excellence in the area of condensed matter physics. It is one of Europe's most prestigious prizes in the field of condensed matter physics. Several laureates of the EPS CMD Europhysics Prize also received a Nobel Prize in Physics or Chemistry.

== Laureates ==
Source: European Physical Society

| Year | Laureate | For |
|---|---|---|
| 1975 | Victor S. Bagaev | The condensation of excitons |
| 1975 | Leonid V. Keldysh | The condensation of excitons |
| 1975 | Jaroslav E. Pokrovsky | The condensation of excitons |
| 1975 | Michel Voos | The condensation of excitons |
| 1976 | Wolfgang Helfrich | Contributions to the physics of liquid crystals |
| 1977 | Walter Eric Spear | Amorphous silicon devices |
| 1978 | Zhores Alferov | Heterojunctions |
| 1979 | Eric A. Ash | The physical principles of surface acoustic wave devices |
| 1979 | Jeffrey H. Collins | The physical principles of surface acoustic wave devices |
| 1979 | Yuri V. Gulaev | The physical principles of surface acoustic wave devices |
| 1979 | K.A. Ingebrigtsen | The physical principles of surface acoustic wave devices |
| 1979 | E.G.S. Paige | The physical principles of surface acoustic wave devices |
| 1980 | O. Krogh Andersen | Original methods for the calculation of the electronic properties of materials |
| 1980 | Andries Rinse Miedema | Original methods for the calculation of the electronic properties of materials |
| 1981 | No award | |
| 1982 | Klaus von Klitzing | Experimental demonstration of the quantized Hall resistance |
| 1983 | Isaac F. Silvera | Atomic and solid hydrogen |
| 1984 | Gerd Binnig | Scanning tunnelling microscope |
| 1984 | Heinrich Rohrer | Scanning tunnelling microscope |
| 1985 | Jens Als-Nielsen | The experimental study of low dimensional physics |
| 1985 | Michael Pepper | The experimental study of low dimensional physics |
| 1986 | Ferenc Mezei | Neutron spin echo spectroscopy |
| 1987 | Igor K. Yanson | Point-contact spectroscopy in metals |
| 1988 | J. Georg Bednorz | Discovery of high-temperature superconductivity |
| 1988 | K. Alex Müller | Discovery of high-temperature superconductivity |
| 1989 | Frank Steglich, | Pioneering investigations of heavy-fermion metals |
| 1989 | Hans-Rudolf Ott | Pioneering investigations of heavy-fermion metals |
| 1989 | Gilbert G. Lonzarich | Pioneering investigations of heavy-fermion metals |
| 1990 | Roberto Car | A novel and powerful method for the ab-initio calculation of molecular dynamics |
| 1990 | Michele Parrinello | A novel and powerful method for the ab-initio calculation of molecular dynamics |
| 1991 | Klaus Bechgaard | Synthesis of a new class of organic metals and the discovery of their superconductivity and novel magnetic properties |
| 1991 | Denis Jérome | Synthesis of a new class of organic metals and the discovery of their superconductivity and novel magnetic properties |
| 1992 | Gerhard Ertl | Pioneering studies of surface structures, dynamics and reactions through the development of novel experimental methods |
| 1992 | Harald Ibach | Pioneering studies of surface structures, dynamics and reactions through the development of novel experimental methods |
| 1992 | J. Peter Toennies | Pioneering studies of surface structures, dynamics and reactions through the development of novel experimental methods |
| 1993 | Boris L. Altshuler | Theoretical work on coherent phenomena in disordered conductors |
| 1993 | Arkadii G. Aronov | Theoretical work on coherent phenomena in disordered conductors |
| 1993 | David E. Khmelnitskii | Theoretical work on coherent phenomena in disordered conductors |
| 1993 | Anatoly I. Larkin | Theoretical work on coherent phenomena in disordered conductors |
| 1993 | Boris Spivak | Theoretical work on coherent phenomena in disordered conductors |
| 1994 | Donald R. Huffman | New molecular forms of carbon and their production in the solid state |
| 1994 | Wolfgang Krätschmer | New molecular forms of carbon and their production in the solid state |
| 1994 | Harry Kroto | New molecular forms of carbon and their production in the solid state |
| 1994 | Richard Smalley | New molecular forms of carbon and their production in the solid state |
| 1995 | Yakir Aharonov | Introduction of fundamental concepts in physics that have profound impact on condensed matter science |
| 1995 | Michael V. Berry | Introduction of fundamental concepts in physics that have profound impact on condensed matter science |
| 1996 | Richard Friend | Pioneering work on semiconducting organic polymer materials and demonstration of an organic light emitting diode |
| 1997 | Albert Fert, | Discovery and contribution to the understanding of the giant magneto-resistance effect in transition-metal multilayers and demonstrations of its potential for technological applications |
| 1997 | Peter Grünberg | Discovery and contribution to the understanding of the giant magneto-resistance effect in transition-metal multilayers and demonstrations of its potential for technological applications |
| 1997 | Stuart Parkin | Discovery and contribution to the understanding of the giant magneto-resistance effect in transition-metal multilayers and demonstrations of its potential for technological applications |
| 1998 | Thomas Maurice Rice | Original contributions to the theory of strongly correlated electron systems |
| 1999 | Christian Glattli | For developing novel techniques for noise measurements in solids leading to experimental observation of carriers with a fractional charge |
| 1999 | Michael Reznikov | For developing novel techniques for noise measurements in solids leading to experimental observation of carriers with a fractional charge |
| 2000 | Paolo Carra | Pioneering work in establishing the field of magnetic x-ray dichroism |
| 2000 | Gerrit van der Laan | Pioneering work in establishing the field of magnetic x-ray dichroism |
| 2000 | Gisela Schütz | Pioneering work in establishing the field of magnetic x-ray dichroism |
| 2001 | Sumio Iijima | Discovery of multi- and single-walled carbon nanotubes and pioneering studies of their fundamental mechanical and electronic properties |
| 2001 | Cees Dekker | Discovery of multi- and single-walled carbon nanotubes and pioneering studies of their fundamental mechanical and electronic properties |
| 2001 | Thomas W. Ebbesen | Discovery of multi- and single-walled carbon nanotubes and pioneering studies of their fundamental mechanical and electronic properties |
| 2001 | Paul L. McEuen | Discovery of multi- and single-walled carbon nanotubes and pioneering studies of their fundamental mechanical and electronic properties |
| 2002 | Bernard Barbara | Development of the field of quantum dynamics of nanomagnets, including the discovery of quantum tunnelling and interference in dynamics of magnetization |
| 2002 | Jonathan Friedman | Development of the field of quantum dynamics of nanomagnets, including the discovery of quantum tunnelling and interference in dynamics of magnetization |
| 2002 | Dante Gatteschi | Development of the field of quantum dynamics of nanomagnets, including the discovery of quantum tunnelling and interference in dynamics of magnetization |
| 2002 | Roberta Sessoli | Development of the field of quantum dynamics of nanomagnets, including the discovery of quantum tunnelling and interference in dynamics of magnetization |
| 2002 | Wolfgang Wernsdorfer | Development of the field of quantum dynamics of nanomagnets, including the discovery of quantum tunnelling and interference in dynamics of magnetization |
| 2003 | Heino Finkelmann | Discovery of a new class of materials called liquid crystal elastomers |
| 2003 | Mark Warner | Discovery of a new class of materials called liquid crystal elastomers |
| 2004 | Michel Devoret | Realisation and demonstration of the quantum bit concept based on superconducting circuits |
| 2004 | Daniel Esteve | Realisation and demonstration of the quantum bit concept based on superconducting circuits |
| 2004 | Johan Mooij | Realisation and demonstration of the quantum bit concept based on superconducting circuits |
| 2004 | Yasunobu Nakamura | Realisation and demonstration of the quantum bit concept based on superconducting circuits |
| 2005 | David Awschalom | For their work on ferromagnetic semiconductors and spintronics |
| 2005 | Tomasz Dietl | For their work on ferromagnetic semiconductors and spintronics |
| 2005 | Hideo Ohno | For their work on ferromagnetic semiconductors and spintronics |
| 2006 | Antoine Georges | Development and application of the dynamical mean field theory |
| 2006 | Gabriel Kotliar | Development and application of the dynamical mean field theory |
| 2006 | Walter Metzner | Development and application of the dynamical mean field theory |
| 2006 | Dieter Vollhardt | Development and application of the dynamical mean field theory |
| 2007 | No award | |
| 2008 | Andre Geim | Discovering and isolating a single free-standing atomic layer of carbon (graphene) and elucidating its remarkable electronic properties |
| 2008 | Kostya Novoselov | Discovering and isolating a single free-standing atomic layer of carbon (graphene) and elucidating its remarkable electronic properties |
| 2009 | No award | |
| 2010 | Hartmut Buhmann | Theoretical prediction and the experimental observation of the quantum spin Hall effect and topological insulators |
| 2010 | Charles Kane | Theoretical prediction and the experimental observation of the quantum spin Hall effect and topological insulators |
| 2010 | Eugene J. Mele | Theoretical prediction and the experimental observation of the quantum spin Hall effect and topological insulators |
| 2010 | Laurens W. Molenkamp | Theoretical prediction and the experimental observation of the quantum spin Hall effect and topological insulators |
| 2010 | Shoucheng Zhang | Theoretical prediction and the experimental observation of the quantum spin Hall effect and topological insulators |
| 2011 | No award | |
| 2012 | Steven T. Bramwell | Prediction and experimental observation of magnetic monopoles in spin ice |
| 2012 | Claudio Castelnovo | Prediction and experimental observation of magnetic monopoles in spin ice |
| 2012 | Santiago Grigera | Prediction and experimental observation of magnetic monopoles in spin ice |
| 2012 | Roderich Moessner | Prediction and experimental observation of magnetic monopoles in spin ice |
| 2012 | Shivaji Sondhi | Prediction and experimental observation of magnetic monopoles in spin ice |
| 2012 | Alan Tennant | Prediction and experimental observation of magnetic monopoles in spin ice |
| 2013 | No award | |
| 2014 | Harold Y. Hwang | The discovery and investigation of electron liquids at oxide interfaces |
| 2014 | Jochen Mannhart | The discovery and investigation of electron liquids at oxide interfaces |
| 2014 | Jean-Marc Triscone | The discovery and investigation of electron liquids at oxide interfaces |
| 2015 | No award | |
| 2016 | Peter Böni | Theoretical prediction, experimental discovery and theoretical analysis of a magnetic skyrmion phase in MnSi, a new state of matter. |
| 2016 | Alexei N. Bogdanov | Theoretical prediction, experimental discovery and theoretical analysis of a magnetic skyrmion phase in MnSi, a new state of matter. |
| 2016 | Christian Pfleiderer | Theoretical prediction, experimental discovery and theoretical analysis of a magnetic skyrmion phase in MnSi, a new state of matter. |
| 2016 | Achim Rosch | Theoretical prediction, experimental discovery and theoretical analysis of a magnetic skyrmion phase in MnSi, a new state of matter. |
| 2016 | Ashvin Vishwanath | Theoretical prediction, experimental discovery and theoretical analysis of a magnetic skyrmion phase in MnSi, a new state of matter. |
| 2017 | No award | |
| 2018 | Lucio Braicovich | The development and scientific exploration of high-resolution Resonant Inelastic X-ray Scattering (RIXS). |
| 2018 | Giacomo Claudio Ghiringhelli | The development and scientific exploration of high-resolution Resonant Inelastic X-ray Scattering (RIXS). |
| 2019 | No award | |
| 2020 | Jörg Wrachtrup | Pioneering studies on quantum coherence in solid-state systems and their applications for sensing, and, in particular, for major breakthroughs in the study of the optical and spin properties of nitrogen vacancy centers in diamond. |
| 2021 | No award | |
| 2022 | Agnès Barthélémy | Seminal contributions to the physics and applications of multiferroic and magnetoelectric materials. |
| 2022 | Manuel Bibes | Seminal contributions to the physics and applications of multiferroic and magnetoelectric materials. |
| 2022 | Ramamoorthy Ramesh | Seminal contributions to the physics and applications of multiferroic and magnetoelectric materials. |
| 2022 | Nicola Spaldin | Seminal contributions to the physics and applications of multiferroic and magnetoelectric materials. |
| 2023 | Claudia Felser | Seminal contributions to the classification, prediction, and discovery of novel topological quantum materials. |
| 2023 | Andrei Bernevig | Seminal contributions to the classification, prediction, and discovery of novel topological quantum materials. |
| 2024 | Andrea Cavalleri | His pioneering studies of photo-induced emergent phases of quantum materials: from enhanced superconductivity to the control of materials topology. |
| 2025 | No award | |
| 2026 | Libor Šmejkal | The discovery of altermagnetism, a third elementary magnetic class that combines ferromagnetic-like and antiferromagnetic-like characteristics considered for a century as mutually exclusive, and characteristics unprecedented in either of the two conventional magnetic classes. |
| 2026 | Jairo Sinova | The discovery of altermagnetism, a third elementary magnetic class that combines ferromagnetic-like and antiferromagnetic-like characteristics considered for a century as mutually exclusive, and characteristics unprecedented in either of the two conventional magnetic classes. |
| 2026 | Tomáš Jungwirth | The discovery of altermagnetism, a third elementary magnetic class that combines ferromagnetic-like and antiferromagnetic-like characteristics considered for a century as mutually exclusive, and characteristics unprecedented in either of the two conventional magnetic classes. |

== See also ==
- List of physics awards
