= Brongersma =

Brongersma is a surname. Notable people with the surname include:

- Edward Brongersma (1911–1998), Dutch politician and jurist
- Leo Brongersma (1907–1994), Dutch zoologist, herpetologist, author and lecturer
- Mark L. Brongersma (born 1969), Dutch physicist
- Titia Brongersma (1650–1700), Dutch poet and writer
