= Bloembergen =

Bloembergen is a Dutch surname. Notable people with the surname include:

- Auke Bloembergen (1927–2016), Dutch jurist and legal scholar
- Nicolaas Bloembergen (1920–2017), Dutch-American physicist

== See also ==
- 10447 Bloembergen, a main-belt asteroid
