= Sackler Prize =

The Sackler Prize is named for the Sackler family and can indicate any of the following three awards established by Raymond Sackler and his wife Beverly Sackler currently bestowed by the Tel Aviv University. The Sackler family is known for its role in the opioid epidemic in the United States, has been the subject of numerous lawsuits and critical media coverage, and been dubbed the "most evil family in America", and "the worst drug dealers in history". The family has engaged in extensive efforts to promote the Sackler name, that has been characterized as reputation laundering. In 2023 the Sackler family's name was removed from the name of the Tel Aviv University Faculty of Medicine. The 2024 prize winners responded by demanding that the prize be renamed.

== Sackler Prize in the Physical Sciences ==
The Raymond and Beverly Sackler International Prize in the Physical Sciences is a $40,000 prize in the disciplines of either physics or chemistry awarded by Tel Aviv University each year for young scientists who have made outstanding and fundamental contributions in their fields.

There is an age limit for all nominees. Nominations for the Sackler Prize can be made by individuals in any of the following categories: 1) Faculty of Physics, Astronomy or Chemistry departments in institutions of higher learning worldwide. 2) Presidents, Rectors, vice-presidents, Provosts and Deans, of institutions of higher learning worldwide. 3) Directors of laboratories worldwide. 4) Sackler Prize laureates.

For 2008, the age limit has been raised to 45 and the prize money to $50,000.

=== Winners ===
Source: Chemistry – Tel Aviv University Physics – Tel Aviv University

- 2000 prize for Physics (Theoretical High Energy Physics): Michael R. Douglas (Rutgers University) and Juan Martin Maldacena (Institute for Advanced Study, Princeton), for work "beyond the 1975 synthesis known as the 'Standard Model' and within the framework of (supersymmetrical) String or M-theory."
- 2001 prize for Chemistry (Physical Chemistry of Advanced Materials): Moungi G. Bawendi (MIT) and James R. Heath (UCLA) "for their seminal contributions to the discovery, development and fundamental and applied studies of nanoscale materials."
- 2002 prize for Physics (Physics of Engineered Materials): Leo P. Kouwenhoven (Delft University of Technology) for the "understanding of electronic states and charge transport in sub-micron systems" and Ullrich Steiner (Cambridge University) "for innovative discoveries in the analysis and control of the structure."
- 2003 prize for Chemistry (Advanced Nanostructed Materials): Chad A. Mirkin (Northwestern University) and Xiaoliang Sunney Xie (Harvard University) "for their seminal contributions to the discovery, design, fabrication and characterization of nano-structure materials, including complex macromolecules and single molecules with biological significance."
- 2004 prize for Physics (Observational or Theoretical Astronomy and Astrophysics): Andrea M. Ghez (UCLA) "for her pioneering high-resolution infrared observations that provide evidence for, and establish the mass of, the supermassive black hole in the center of the galaxy" and Adam G. Riess (Space Telescope Science Institute in Baltimore, Maryland) "for his contributions to the observational study of distant Type Ia supernovae that reveal the accelerating expansion of the universe and the possible existence of dark energy."
- 2005 prize for Chemistry (Theoretical Chemistry): Christoph Dellago (University of Vienna), Christopher Jarzynski (Los Alamos National Laboratory) and David Reichman (Columbia University), "for their ground-breaking developments in statistical mechanics and seminal contributions to the dynamics of disordered condensed matter."
- 2006 prize in Physics: Yuri Kovchegov (Ohio State University) for 'his work in quantum chromodynamics at very high energies and gluon densities' and Thomas Glasmacher (Michigan State University) for 'developing new sensitive methods of studying nuclear structure, utilizing Coulomb excitation with fast beams of rare isotopes'.
- 2007 for Chemistry (for Metals in Synthesis): Christopher C. Cummins (Massachusetts Institute of Technology) and John F. Hartwig (University of Illinois, Urbana-Champaign)
- 2008 prize for Physics (Physics Beyond the Standard Model in the LHC Era): Nima Arkani-Hamed (Institute for Advanced Study, Princeton) for 'his novel, deep and highly influential contributions to new paradigms for physics beyond the Standard Model at the TeV energy scale, especially the ideas of large extra dimensions and of the large hierarchy of strengths of fundamental forces in Nature, including gravity; supersymmetry model-building; theories of flavor and of neutrino masses; and models of the cosmological constant'
- 2009 prize for Chemistry (Total Synthesis of Biologically Active Natural Products): Phil S. Baran (Scripps Research Institute, Department of Chemistry, La Jolla) for 'his seminal contribution through a series of groundbreaking syntheses that demonstrated the advantages of the novel oxidative CC bond formation in terms of efficiency, practicality, stereocontrol and "redox-economy"'; Matthew D. Shair (Harvard University) for 'his seminal contribution to the syntheses of complex natural products by using new cascade reactions to rapidly achieve molecular complexity' and Brian M. Stoltz (California Institute of Technology, Pasadena) for 'his seminal contribution through the development of enantioselective methods for oxidation and catalytic bond construction'.
- 2010 prize for Physics (Nano-Photonics and Nano-Plasmonics): Mark L. Brongersma (Geballe Laboratory of Advanced Materials, Stanford University) for 'outstanding experimental and theoretical research in nano-plasmonics and nano-photonics; in particular on the emission of light from nano-structures that support propagating surface plasmons' and Stefan A. Maier (Imperial College, London)for 'outstanding theoretical and experimental research in nano-plasmonics and nano-photonics; in particular on the propagation of surface plasmons-polaritons along a chain of metallic nano-particles'
- 2011 prize for Chemistry (Molecular Dynamics of Chemical Reactions): Gregory D. Scholes (University of Toronto) for 'his seminal contribution to the field of ultrafast spectroscopy' and Martin T. Zanni (University of Wisconsin-Madison) for 'his seminal contribution to the field of ultrafast spectroscopy'.
- 2012 prize for Physics (Study of Extra-solar Planets): David Charbonneau (Harvard University) for 'his breakthrough discoveries, including the first detections of transiting extra-solar planets and spectroscopic observations of their atmosphere' and Sara Seager (MIT) for 'her brilliant theoretical studies, including analysis of the atmospheres and internal compositions of extra-solar planets'.
- 2013 prize for Chemistry (Functionalization of Carbon-Hydrogen Bonds in Organic Synthesis): Melanie S. Sanford (University of Michigan, Ann Arbor) and Jin-Quan Yu (The Scripps Research Institute, La Jolla) for 'their seminal contributions to the catalytic functionalization of carbon – hydrogen bonds'
- 2014 prize for Physics (Topological Phases in Condensed Matter): B. Andrei Bernevig (Princeton University) for 'his theoretical contribution towards a first realization of a two dimensional topological insulator'; Liang Fu (MIT) for 'his contribution to generalization of the concept of topological insulators from two to three dimensions' and Xiaoliang Qi (Stanford University) for 'his contribution to the prediction of the quantum anomalous Hall effect in magnetic topological insulators'
- 2016 prize for Chemistry (Magnetic Resonance): John Morton (London Centre for Nanotechnology) for 'his outstanding and imaginative applications of magnetic resonance to quantum information storage and processing'; Guido Pintacuda (Institute of Analytical Sciences (High-Field NMR Centre)) for 'his elegant methodological advances in solid state NMR spectroscopy' and Charalampos Babis Kalodimos (University of Minnesota) for 'detailed characterizations of structure, function and dynamics in a number of challenging and important biological systems through solution NMR spectroscopy'.
- 2017 prize for Biophysics (Mesoscopic physics of cellular phenomena): Tuomas Knowles (University of Cambridge) for 'elucidating physical principles of amyloid fibril formation with important applications in biology and medicine'.
- 2018 price for Physics (Quantum Field Theory): Zohar Komargodski (Weizmann Institute, Israel) and Pedro Vieira (Perimeter Institute, Canada) for 'their outstanding work probing QFT in non-perturbative regimes'.
- 2019 prize for Chemistry: Christopher Chang (University of California, Berkeley), Jason W. Chin (University of Cambridge) and Matthew Disney (Scripps Research in Florida).

== Sackler Prize in Biophysics ==
The Raymond and Beverly Sackler International Prize in Biophysics is intended to encourage dedication to science, originality and excellence by rewarding outstanding scientists. The prizes are awarded by Tel Aviv University.

Recipients have been: (Source: Tel Aviv University )

- 2006: Harvey T. McMahon (MRC Laboratory of Molecular Biology, Cambridge) and Paul R. Selvin (University of Illinois)
- 2007: Clare M. Waterman-Storer (Scripps Research Institute, Department of Cell Biology, La Jolla, California) and Frank Jülicher (Max Planck Institute for the Physics of Complex Systems in Dresden, Germany).
- 2008: David Baker (University of Washington); Martin Gruebele (University of Illinois) and Jonathan S. Weissman (University of California, San Francisco)
- 2010: Gerhard Hummer (National Institutes of Health, Bethesda) and Yigong Shi (School of Life Sciences, Tsinghua University, Beijing)
- 2011: Stephen R. Quake (Stanford University) and Xiaowei Zhuang (Harvard University)

== Sackler Prize in Music Composition ==
There is also a Raymond and Beverly Sackler Prize in Music Composition, the purpose of which is to provide financial support for the creation of new musical works, and which is administered by the School of Fine Arts at the University of Connecticut. Established in 2000, the international award offers a substantial recognition including public performances, recordings, and a prize of $25,000 (USD).

- 2002: Gabriella Lena Frank
- 2003: Karim Al-Zand
- 2006: Rufus Reid
- 2007: Sheila Silver
- 2008: Nathan Currier
- 2009: J. Mark Scearce
- 2012: Kevin Walcyzk
- 2013: Steven Sametz
- 2015: David Dzubay
- 2017: Douglas Buchanan

== See also ==
- List of chemistry awards
- List of physics awards
- List of biology awards
