= Manuel Bibes =

French Physicist working on Oxide Spintronics

Dr. Manuel Bibes
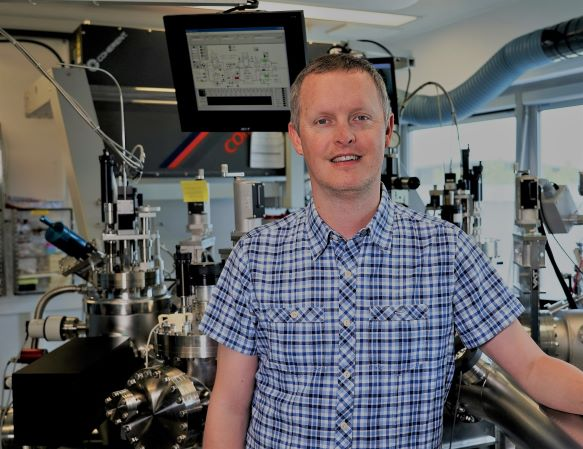
- Born: July 15, 1976 (age 50); Sainte-Foy-la-Grande
- Education: Institut national des sciences appliquées de Toulouse; Autonomous University of Barcelona (Ph.D.)
- Occupation: Physicist
- Employer: French National Centre for Scientific Research
- Website: https://oxitronics.cnrs.fr/manuel-bibes/

Manuel Bibes (born July 15, 1976) is a French physicist specializing in functional oxides, multiferroic materials, and spintronics. He is currently a Research Director at the National Center for Scientific Research (CNRS).

== Biography ==
Bibes was born on July 15, 1976 in Sainte-Foy-la-Grande. After earning an engineering degree from the Institut National des Sciences Appliquées de Toulouse in 1998, Bibes completed his Ph.D. under the supervision of Josep Fontcuberta at the ICMAB, at the Autonomous University of Barcelona in 2001, focusing on thin manganite films and their application in spintronics. His PhD was followed by a postdoctoral fellowship at the Joint Physics Unit CNRS/Thales (currently known as Laboratory Albert Fert) under the guidance of Prof. Albert Fert. Bibes joined the CNRS in 2003 at the Institute of Fundamental Electronics, now known as the Center for Nanoscience and Nanotechnology (C2N). Afterwards he completed research stays at MIT and the University of Cambridge as a visiting researcher and joined the Laboratory Albert Fert at 2007. All his research publications are listed in Google Scholar.

Throughout his career, Bibes has been a leader in research of multiferroic materials (which simultaneously exhibits magnetic and ferroelectric properties) and their utilisation in electrical control of magnetism. In 2009, his team discovered the phenomenon of giant tunnel electroresistance in ferroelectric tunnel junctions (results published in Nature) demonstrating their potential as artificial synapses. In 2016, in collaboration with the Spintec laboratory, he demonstrated that non-magnetic oxide interfaces can be used as ultrasensitive spin detectors. This findings led to a collaboration with Intel for the development of a new type of energy efficient transistor (MESO) aimed at replacing the current transistors based on CMOS technology. Since 2018, Manuel Bibes has been recognized as a Highly Cited Researcher by Clarivate Analytics. In June 2022, along with Agnès Barthélémy, Ramamoorthy Ramesh and Nicola Spaldin, he received the Europhysics Prize from the European Physical Society for their significant contributions to the fundamental and applied physics of multiferroic and magnetoelectric materials. In October 2024, he co-founds the start-up company Nellow, together with Laurent Vila and Jean-Philippe Attané from Spintec. Nellow aims to develop and commercialize chips with an ultralow power consumption for logic and artificial intelligence.

== Awards and honors ==
- CNRS Silver Medal, CNRS (2025)
- Europhysics Prize, European Physical Society (2022)
- ERC Advanced Grant, European Research Council (2019)
- Friedrich Wilhelm Bessel Research Award, Alexander von Humboldt Foundation (2018)
- Descartes-Huygens Prize, French Academy of Sciences and Royal Netherlands Academy of Arts and Sciences (2017)
- Fellow of American Physical Society, APS (2015)
- ERC Consolidator Grant, European Research Council, ERC (2014)
- EU-40 Materials Prize, European Materials Research Society, EMRS (2013)
- Extraordinary Doctorate Award, Autonomous University of Barcelona (2001)

== Selected lectures and talks ==
- Electric-field control of magnetism in oxide heterostructures (Seminar at Collège de France, May 30, 2017)
- A journey through the oxide world (a talk at French Academy of Sciences, February 20, 2018)
