= Marjolein =

Marjolein (Dutch pronunciation: [mɑrjoːˈlɛin]) less commonly spelled as Marjolijn, is a Dutch feminine given name. It probably originated as an extension of the name Maria, guided to be identical to the Dutch name for marjoram.

== People named Marjolein/Marjolijn ==
People with the given name Marjolein include:

- Marjolein Bastin (born 1943), Dutch nature artist, writer, children's author and illustrator
- Marjolein Beumer (born 1966), Dutch actress
- Marjolein Buis (born 1988), Dutch wheelchair tennis player
- Marjolein Decroix (born 1992), Belgian alpine skier
- Marjolein Delno (born 1994), Dutch swimmer
- Marjolein Dijkstra (born 1967), Dutch physicist
- Marjolein Eijsvogel (born 1961), Dutch field hockey player
- Marjolein Faber (born 1960), Dutch politician
- Marjolein van't Geloof (born 1996), Dutch racing cyclist
- Marjolein de Jong (born 1968), Dutch volleyball player
- Marjolein Kooijman (born 1980), Dutch bass guitarist
- Marjolein Kriek (born 1973), Dutch clinical geneticist
- Marjolein Lindemans (born 1994), Belgian haptahtlete
- Marjolein Lips-Wiersma, New Zealand business ethics academic
- Marjolein Moorman (born 1974), Dutch politician
- Marjolein Robertson, Scottish stand-up comedian and actress
- Marjolein Tambayong (1937-2022), Indonesian actress
- Marjolein van der Meulen (born 1965), American biomedical engineer

People with the given name Marjolijn include:

- Marjolijn Both (born 1971), Dutch synchronized swimmer
- Marjolijn Februari pseudonym of Maxim Februari (born 1963), Dutch writer, philosopher and columnist
- Marjolijn Hof (born 1956), Dutch writer
- Marjolijn Molenaar (born 1983), Dutch cricketer
- Marjolijn Verspoor (born 1952), Dutch professor of English
