= Dieter Vollhardt =

Dieter Vollhardt (born September 8, 1951) is a German physicist and was Professor of Theoretical Physics at the University of Augsburg from 1996 to 2018.

== Scientific work ==
Vollhardt's scientific career began in 1976 with research into superfluid helium-3. In the early 1980s he worked on the theory of Anderson localization. From 1983 onwards, he focused on many-body correlation effects in Fermi systems. Vollhardt is one of the founders of the Dynamical Mean-Field Theory (DMFT) for strongly correlated materials such as transition metals (e.g. iron or vanadium) and their oxides, i.e. materials with electrons in open d- and f-shells. The properties of these systems are determined by the Coulomb repulsion between the electrons which makes these electrons strongly correlated. The repulsion has the tendency to localize electrons. This leads to a multitude of phenomena such as the Mott-Hubbard metal insulator transition. Conventional band theory or density functional theory cannot describe these systems adequately. In 1989 Vollhardt and his doctoral student Walter Metzner introduced electronic models with local interaction (Hubbard model) on a lattice with infinitely many nearest neighbors, which Gabriel Kotliar and Antoine Georges then developed into the DMFT. The DMFT may be viewed as a self-consistent, field-theoretical generalization of a quantum impurity model by Philip W. Anderson, where the mean-field describes the coupling of the impurity to an "electronic bath".

DMFT provides an exact description of the quantum dynamics of correlated lattice systems with local interactions, but it neglects spatial correlations. It has provided fundamental insights into the properties of correlated electronic systems. The combination of the DMFT with material-specific approaches, such as the "Local Density Approximation" (LDA) to the density functional theory, led to a new computational scheme, often referred to as LDA+DMFT, for the investigation of strongly correlated materials.

== Selected awards ==
- 2006 Europhysics Prize of the European Physical Society "for the development and application of the dynamical mean field theory" (together with A. Georges, G. Kotliar, W. Metzner)
- 2010 Max Planck medal of the German Physical Society "in recognition of his significant contributions to the derivation of a new mean-field theory of correlated quantum systems and to the understanding of many-body problems in the quantum theory of condensed matter"
- 2011 Ernst Mach Honorary Medal of the Academy of Sciences of the Czech Republic "for Merit in the Physical Sciences"
- 2020 Fellow of the American Physical Society "for pioneering contributions in condensed matter theory, in particular on strongly correlated electron systems, on disordered quantum systems, and on the superfluid phases of helium-3"
- 2022 Eugene Feenberg Medal in Many-Body Physics "for their groundbreaking development of a novel quantum many-body theory of correlated electron systems, the dynamical mean-field theory, and in particular for their application of this approach to explain and predict the properties of correlated electron materials (together with A. Georges, G. Kotliar)
- 2024 Honorary Doctorate of the University of Warsaw, Poland

== Selected publications ==
- Vollhardt, D. (2011). "Dynamical mean-field theory for correlated electrons" (PDF). Annalen der Physik. 524 (1): 1–19. Bibcode:2012AnP...524....1V. doi:10.1002/andp.201100250.
- with Gabriel Kotliar (2004). "Strongly correlated materials: Insights from dynamical mean field theory" (PDF). Physics Today. 57 (3): 53. Bibcode:2004PhT....57c..53K. doi:10.1063/1.1712502.
- Strong-coupling approaches to correlated Fermions, in: Enrico Fermi Course 121, Broglia, Schrieffer (ed.), North Holland 1994
- with Peter Wölfle, Superfluid Phases of Helium 3, Taylor and Francis 1990, corrected reprint by Dover Publications 2013
- Vollhardt, Dieter (1984). "Normal He 3 : an almost localized Fermi liquid". Reviews of Modern Physics. 56 (1): 99–120. Bibcode:1984RvMP...56...99V. doi:10.1103/RevModPhys.56.99.
- with Peter Wölfle (1980) "A Diagrammic, Self-Consistent Treatment of the Anderson Localization Problem in d ≤ 2 Dimensions" (PDF). Physical Review B. 22 (10): 4666. 1980. doi:10.1103/PhysRevB.22.4666.
