= Eugene J. Mele =

American physicist

Eugene John Mele
- Born: October 16, 1950; Philadelphia, Pennsylvania
- Citizenship: United States
- Education: Saint Joseph's University (B.S., 1972); Massachusetts Institute of Technology (Ph.D, 1978)
- Known for: quantum spin Hall effect
- Awards: Ira Abrams Award for Distinguished Teaching (1998); Franklin Medal (2015); Fontiers of Knowledge Award (2018); Breakthrough Prize in Fundamental Physics (2019); John Scott Medal (2019)
- Scientific career
- Fields: Condensed Matter Physics
- Workplaces: Massachusetts Institute of Technology; Xerox Webster Research Center; University of Pennsylvania
- Thesis: New theoretical methods for the study of the electronic structure of solids (1978)
- Doctoral advisor: John Joannopoulos
- Doctoral students: Dina Zhabinskaya; Paul Michalski; Jesse Kinder; Ahmed Maarouf; Michael V. Pykhtin; Chengyu Wei; Suklyun Hong; Maneesh Deshpande; C. Stephen Hellberg; Myung Ho Kang; Han-Yong. Choi; Oscar L. Alerhand; Geoffrey W. Hayden; David P. DiVincenzo

Eugene John "Gene" Mele is a professor of physics at the University of Pennsylvania, where he researches quantum electric phenomena in condensed matter. He is known for predicting the quantum spin Hall effect.

== Biography ==
Mele graduated from Saint Joseph's University in 1972 and obtained a Ph.D. in physics from the Massachusetts Institute of Technology in 1978. After working as a research assistant at the Xerox Research Center in Webster, New York, he was appointed assistant professor at the University of Pennsylvania in 1981 and promoted to full professor in 1989. Since 2014 he has also been visiting faculty at Loughborough University in the United Kingdom.

== Research ==
Together with Charles Kane, he predicted the quantum spin Hall effect in graphene which later was called time-reversal invariant topological insulator for the corresponding two dimensional structures. The existence of quantum spin Hall effect has since been experimentally verified in HgTe quantum wells, and the prospect of applications for these old materials (predicted by others) has stimulated new research interest.

== Honours and awards ==
Mele and Kane were awarded the 2019 Breakthrough Prize in Fundamental Physics. and the 2018 BBVA Foundation Frontiers of Knowledge Award in Basic Sciences. They had previously received the Benjamin Franklin Medal of the Franklin Institute in 2015, with Shoucheng Zhang, and the European Physical Society Condensed Matter Division Europhysics Prize in 2010 with Zhang, Hartmut Buhmann, and Laurens Molenkamp. He was elected a fellow of the American Physical Society in 2001. He was elected to The National Academy of Sciences in 2019.
