= Suzanne Amador Kane =

Physicist

- Born: Suzanne Marie Amador
- Education: Massachusetts Institute of Technology, BS, 1982; Harvard University, MS, 1984; Harvard University, PhD, 1989
- Spouse: Charles L. Kane
- Scientific career
- Fields: Biophysics
- Workplaces: Haverford College
- Thesis: Optical and X-Ray Studies of Critical Phenomena in Thin Liquid Crystal Films (1989)
- Doctoral advisor: Peter Pershan
- Website: Research website

Suzanne Amador Kane is a physicist and Professor of Physics and Astronomy at Haverford College. She is well known for her work utilizing video to understand the behavior of various species of birds.

== Education and early career ==
Kane received her Bachelor of Science degree in physics in 1982 from Massachusetts Institute of Technology. She then attended Harvard University for her Master of Science degree and her PhD. There she worked in the laboratory of applied physicist Peter Pershan. Her thesis, entitled Optical and X-Ray Studies of Critical Phenomena in Thin Liquid Crystal Films and published in 1989, focused on utilizing x-ray and light scattering techniques to study biological membranes and low-dimensional soft matter systems. Following her PhD, she became a postdoctoral research associate at the University of Pennsylvania, working in the laboratory of J. Kent Blasie between 1988 and 1990. There, she continued her work using scattering techniques to understand the structures of multilayer films and biological membranes.

== Research ==
In 1991, Kane became an assistant professor at Haverford College, where she was eventually promoted to professor in 2016. Kane's research centers on the intersection between biophysics, soft condensed matter physics, and statistical physics to understand a range of topics, from the behavior of birds to the bacterial diversity of ecosystems, using experimental techniques that include bioacoustics, computer modeling, and 3D video analysis.

Kane's group has worked to understand a range of bird behaviors. In 2016, her group published a study on how raptors (like hawks, vultures, and falcons) hunt, turning their heads unpredictably as they visually search for their prey. Raptors hunt by alternating periods of rapid head or eye movement—a movement that is known as saccades—with periods during which their eyes are fixed on a specific point. To determine if there was a discernible pattern to this movement, they fitted a Northern goshawk with a tiny head-mounted camera to track its head movements while hunting. They used the video to determine the mathematical distribution of time spent during each saccade and time spent with their heads still and found that the time between each saccade varied depending on external environmental cues, which changed as the hawks honed in on their target. Notably, this behavior is similar to that of primates while they hunt, suggesting that the basic neural processes underlying hunting are the same between primate and raptor hunters. Kane and her team have also studied the predator-prey interactions as Goshawks hunt and their prey evade. Once again, by mounting a camera on a goshawk's head, she observed the different pursuit strategies employed by a hawk as it pursues its prey. Goshawks employ one of two strategies when pursuing their prey, either intercepting the path of their prey at an oblique angle, or chasing their prey by flying directly after it. They also discovered a third pursuit strategy that they are working to classify. When hunting, a goshawk will use a combination of these flight trajectories. In an earlier study, analyzing video of falcons hunting, Kane observed a similar combination flight pattern, with falcons switching between the intercept and chase strategy. Her team also observed that falcons kept their prey at a fixed position to one side, rather than attacking them straight on, exploiting an effect known as motion camouflage to minimize the chance that their prey will detect them. In this particular study, Kane and her group attached cameras to backpacks strapped to the birds or on helmets strapped to their heads to record their movement.

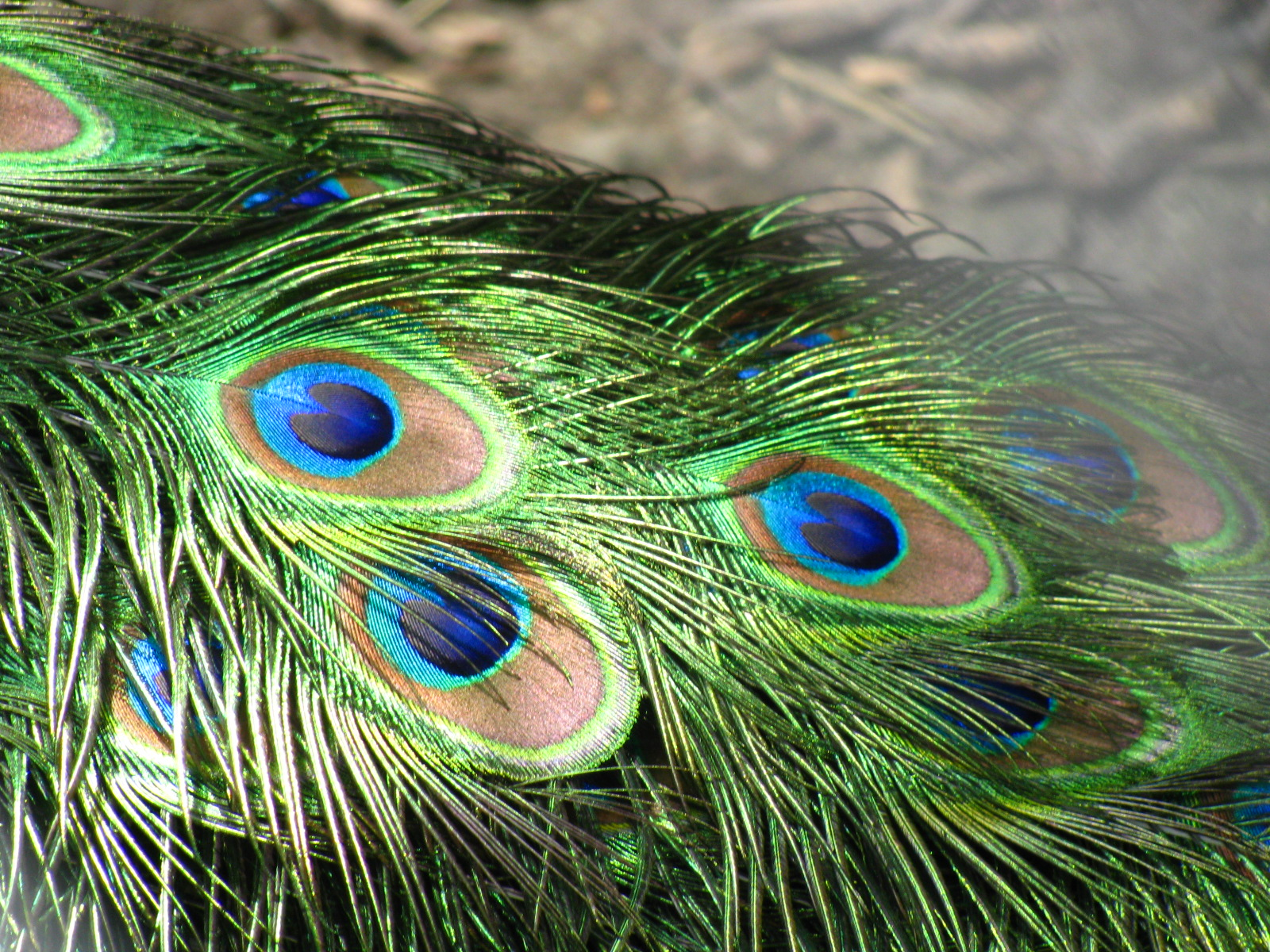
The eyespots, picture above, of the peacock feather contribute to the reproductive success of male peacocks.

Kane has also studied the biomechanics of peacock courtship rituals. Specifically, her group focused on how feather biomechanics influence the performance of male peacocks as they court females by fanning out and vibrating their tail feathers, a display behavior known as "train-rattling." Kane initially discovered high-speed recordings of the behavior, captured by her collaborator Roslyn Dakin, who was studying the color of peacock feathers. The two began working together to capture more videos of peacock courtship rituals to understand how the tail feathers vibrate, and how those vibrations are received by the females. They found that the train-rattling behavior only occurs when females are present and that, as the tail shakes, the eyespots on the tail appear not to move, leading them to conclude that the shaking behavior enhances the appearance of the eyespots of the tail. In previous work, Dakin found that the hue and iridescence of the tail's eyespots contribute to the mating success of the male. They also found that the tail feathers vibrate at their natural resonance frequency, producing sound waves that are within the audible range that females are able to hear. Finally, they counterintuitively found that the longer and heavier the male's tail feathers were, the faster they were able to shake their feathers. In a follow-up study published in 2018, Kane and Dakin found that the vibrations sent out by males rattling their trains are actually felt by females on the crest of their head, which vibrates in turn. They found that at the base of the a female's crest feathers lies a tiny feather known as a filoplume, which acts as a mechanical sensor. When the crest feathers begin vibrating, the filoplume triggers a nerve cell, translating the physical vibrations of the plume into neuronal signal. To understand whether female plume vibrations were specifically in response to the mechanical signals sent out by male train rattling, Kane and Dakin used speakers to play a number of different sounds for female peacocks. The crests only vibrated in response to the train rattling sounds, with no response recorded when the researchers played white noise.

== Awards & honors ==
- New Directions Fellowship, Andrew W. Mellon Foundation, 2004
- Fellow of the American Physical Society, 2020
