= Ramamoorthy =

Ramamoorthy may refer to:

- Ramamoorthy Ramesh (born 1960), American materials scientist of Indian descent
- T. K. Ramamoorthy (1922–2013), South Indian Tamil music composer and violinist

== See also ==
- Viswanathan–Ramamoorthy, South Indian music director duo, composed of M. S. Viswanathan and T. K. Ramamoorthy
- Viswanathan Ramamoorthy (film), Indian 2001 Tamil language film directed by Rama Narayanan
