= List of Fritz London Memorial Lectures =

The Fritz London Memorial Lectures at Duke University invites scientists who impinge at one or more points upon the various fields of physics and chemistry to which Fritz London contributed. The series is partially supported by an endowment fund established by John Bardeen "to perpetuate the memory of Fritz London, distinguished scientist and member of the Duke faculty from 1939 to the time of his death in 1954, and to promote research and understanding of Physics at Duke University and in the wider scientific community. "

== List of lecturers ==
- 1956 Lothar Wolfgang Nordheim
- 1957 James Franck
- 1958 Hendrik Casimir
- 1959 Felix Bloch
- 1960 Cornelis J. Gorter
- 1962 Linus C. Pauling
- 1963 Peter J.W. Debye
- 1964 John Bardeen
- 1965 William M. Fairbank
- 1966 Chen Ning Yang
- 1968 Walter Thirring
- 1969 Eugene P. Wigner
- 1971 Lars Onsager
- 1972 Jesse Beams
- 1973 David Pines
- 1974 J. Robert Schrieffer
- 1975 Michael Fisher
- 1976 Hans Bethe
- 1977 Victor Weisskopf
- 1978 Philip W. Anderson
- 1981 Edward Teller
- 1982 Murray Gell-Mann
- 1984 John C. Wheatley
- 1984 John A. Wheeler
- 1985 Pierre-Gilles de Gennes
- 1986 Richard N. Zare
- 1987 Benjamin Widom
- 1988 K. Alex Müller
- 1989 William Klemperer
- 1990 Freeman Dyson
- 1991 Rudolph Marcus
- 1992 Heinrich Rohrer
- 1993 John C. Polanyi
- 1994 Guenter Ahlers
- 1995 Walter Kohn
- 1996 Russell J. Donnelly
- 1998 Robert C. Richardson
- 1999 Ahmed H. Zewail
- 2000 Wolfgang Ketterle
- 2001 Richard Smalley
- 2002 Harry Swinney
- 2003 Harry B. Gray: Electron Tunneling Through Proteins
- 2004 Myriam Sarachik: Metal-Insulator Transitions
- 2005 Charles M. Lieber: Nanotechnology: Emerging Opportunities in Electronics, Biology and Much More!
- 2006 Frank Wilczek: The Universe is a Strange Place
- 2007 John Hopfield: How do we Think so Fast? From Neurons to Brain Computations
- 2008 Jerry Gollub : Novel Ways of Studying Fluid Flows
- 2009 William H. Miller: Quantum effects in the dynamics of complex molecular systems
- 2010 Anthony James Leggett: Does the everyday world really obey quantum mechanics?
- 2011 Daan Frenkel:Van der Waals, Kamerlingh Onnes, and Phase Transitions: From Helium to Protein Crystal Nucleation
- 2012 Mildred Dresselhaus:The Wonders of Low-Dimensional Nanocarbons
- 2013 Judith Klinman:Moving through Barriers: Unlocking the Mysteries of How Enzymes Really Work
- 2014 David Weitz: Dripping, Jetting, Drops and Wetting: The Magic of Microfluidics
- 2015 Mark A. Ratner: "By Indirections find Directions Out: Electronic Motion in Non-periodic Molecular Solids"
- 2016 Sidney R. Nagel: "The Life and Death of a Drop"
- 2017 Emily A. Carter: "Quantum mechanical solutions for our energy future"
- 2018 Charles L. Kane: "Topological Phases of Matter"
- 2019 Josef Michl: "Porphene - a Heterocyclic Analog of Graphene"
