= David Awschalom =

American physicist (born 1956)

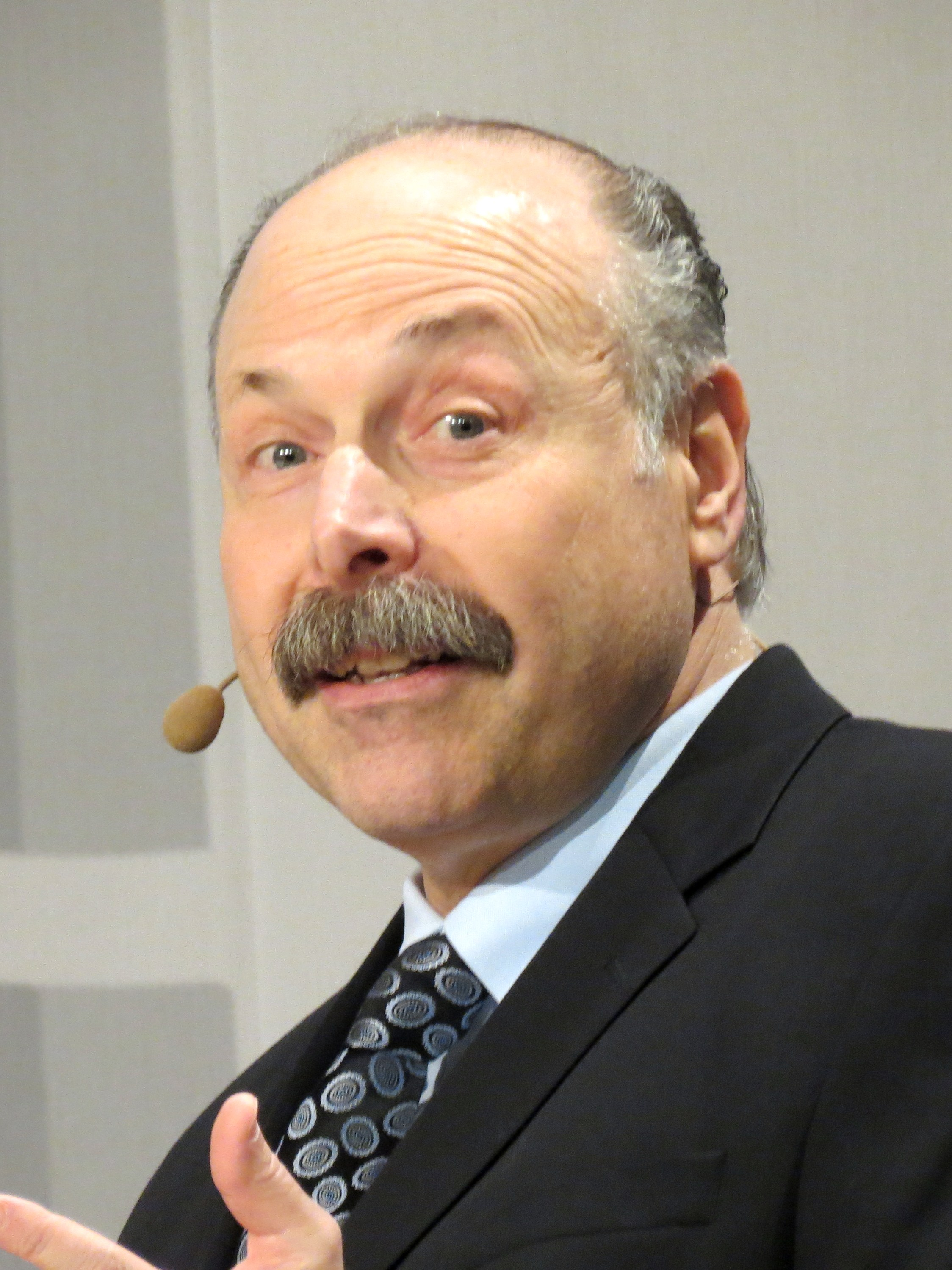
- David Awschalom speaking at the 2013 Nobel Week Dialogue in Göteborg, Sweden
- Born: October 11, 1956 (age 70); Baton Rouge, Louisiana, United States
- Education: University of Illinois at Urbana Champaign(BS); Cornell University(PhD)
- Awards: Oliver E. Buckley Prize(2005); Agilent Europhysics Prize(2005); Turnbull Lectureship Award(2010)
- Scientific career
- Fields: Condensed matter physics Spintronics
- Workplaces: University of Chicago; University of California, Santa Barbara

David D. Awschalom (born 1956 in Baton Rouge, Louisiana, United States) is an American condensed matter experimental physicist. He is best known for his work in spintronics in semiconductors.

Awschalom graduated from the University of Illinois at Urbana–Champaign with a B.Sc. in physics. He received a Ph.D. in experimental physics from Cornell University. He is the director of the Chicago Quantum Exchange and a Liew Family Professor in Molecular Engineering at the University of Chicago's Pritzker School of Molecular Engineering (PME). He previously served as the director of the California Nanosystems Institute and was a professor in the physics department at the University of California, Santa Barbara as well as an associated faculty member in the department of electrical and computer engineering. He has a Hirsch number of 119.

== Awards and honors ==
- elected Fellow of the American Physical Society (1992)
- Oliver E. Buckley Prize by the American Physical Society (2005)
- Agilent Europhysics Prize by the European Physical Society (2005)
- elected fellow of the American Academy of Arts and Sciences (2006)
- elected member of National Academy of Sciences (2007)
- Turnbull Lectureship Award from the Materials Research Society (2010)
- elected member of National Academy of Engineering (2011)
