= Thomas Maurice Rice =

Theoretical physicist and professor (1939–2024)

T. Maurice Rice
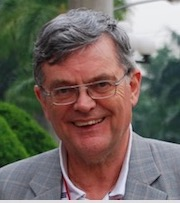
- Born: 26 January 1939; Dundalk, Ireland
- Died: 18 July 2024 (aged 85); Küsnacht, Switzerland
- Education: University College Dublin, Ireland; Cambridge University, U.K.
- Awards: Hewlett-Packard Europhysics Prize (1998); John Bardeen Prize (2000)
- Scientific career
- Fields: Theoretical Condensed Matter Physics
- Workplaces: Bell Labs (Murray Hill, New Jersey); ETH Zurich (Switzerland)

Thomas Maurice Rice (January 26, 1939 – July 18, 2024), known professionally as Maurice Rice, was an Irish theoretical physicist specializing in condensed matter physics.

== Life ==
Thomas Maurice Rice was born on 26 January 1939 in Dundalk, Ireland. He is the younger brother of structural engineer Peter Rice. He grew up in 52 Castle Road, Dundalk in County Louth with his two siblings. Like his brother, he studied at the local Christian Brothers school, Coláiste Rís. Subsequently he studied physics as an undergraduate at University College Dublin and as a graduate student with Volker Heine at the University of Cambridge. In 1964, he moved to the US and spent two years as a post-doc with Walter Kohn at the University of California, San Diego. Then he joined the technical staff at Bell Labs in 1966, where he stayed until 1981, when he joined the Institute for Theoretical Physics at the Eidgenössische Technische Hochschule (ETH) in Zürich, Switzerland.

Rice and his wife, Helen, moved with their family of a son and two daughters from New Jersey to Zürich. Rice retired from teaching in 2004 and is an Emeritus Professor at ETH. Rice died on 18 July 2024, at the age of 85.

== Career ==
Rice graduated at a time when the field of condensed matter physics expanded from the study of just simple metals and semiconductors to cover a broad range of compound materials. This led him to collaborate with both theorists and experimentalists to analyse the electronic properties of new materials. He joined Bell Labs in the 1960s and 1970s, studying metal-insulator transitions in transition metal oxides, electron-hole liquids in optically pumped semiconductors, and charge and spin density waves.

In the early 1980s, Rice moved to ETH Zurich, a few years before Georg Bednorz and K. Alex Müller at the nearby IBM laboratories made their discovery of high temperature superconductivity in layered cuprate compounds. Rice switched his research to the challenges posed by these novel superconductors. Cuprates became a major topic in condensed matter physics, as a range of properties in addition to high temperature superconductivity were discovered. Rice and collaborators concentrated on developing a consistent microscopic interpretation of the growing experimental results. One challenge was the microscopic description of the mysterious pseudogap phase, which appears in a range of intermediate hole doping; his research group focused on the role of enhanced Umklapp scattering in a nearly half-filled band as key to the unexpected features.

=== Brinkman–Rice transition ===
In 1970, Rice and William F. Brinkman helped to characterize the transition from metal to insulator in semiconductors, adding to the Mott–Hubbard approximation. They published a paper addressing the problem of 'the excitation of two electrons to the outside of the Fermi sea', in which they modeled approaching the transition from the uncorrelated metallic state, where each orbital is half-filled.

== Awards and honours ==
- D.Sc (h.c.) National University of Ireland (1989)
- Honorary Member, Royal Irish Academy (1988)
- Member, National Academy of Sciences (1993)
- Fellow of The Royal Society (2002)
- EPS Europhysics Prize (1998)
- John Bardeen Prize (2000)

== Selected papers ==
The following papers are Rice's most cited:

- Brinkman, W. F.; Rice, T. M. (15 November 1970). "Application of Gutzwiller's Variational Method to the Metal-Insulator Transition". Physical Review B. 2 (10): 4302–4304. Bibcode:1970PhRvB...2.4302B. doi:10.1103/PhysRevB.2.4302.
- Brinkman, W. F.; Rice, T. M. (15 February 1973). "Electron-Hole Liquids in Semiconductors". Physical Review B. 7 (4): 1508–1523. Bibcode:1973PhRvB...7.1508B. doi:10.1103/PhysRevB.7.1508.
- Zhang, F. C.; Rice, T. M. (1 March 1988). "Effective Hamiltonian for the superconducting Cu oxides". Physical Review B. 37 (7): 3759–3761. Bibcode:1988PhRvB..37.3759Z. doi:10.1103/PhysRevB.37.3759. PMID 9944993.
- Honerkamp, C.; Salmhofer, M.; Furukawa, N.; Rice, T. M. (2 January 2001). "Breakdown of the Landau-Fermi liquid in two dimensions due to umklapp scattering". Physical Review B. 63 (3) 035109. arXiv:cond-mat/9912358. Bibcode:2001PhRvB..63c5109H. doi:10.1103/PhysRevB.63.035109.
- Rice, T M; Yang, Kai-Yu; Zhang, F C (1 January 2012). "A phenomenological theory of the anomalous pseudogap phase in underdoped cuprates". Reports on Progress in Physics. 75 (1) 016502. arXiv:1109.0632. Bibcode:2012RPPh...75a6502R. doi:10.1088/0034-4885/75/1/016502. PMID 22790307. S2CID 15563340.
