= Lorentz Medal =

Award

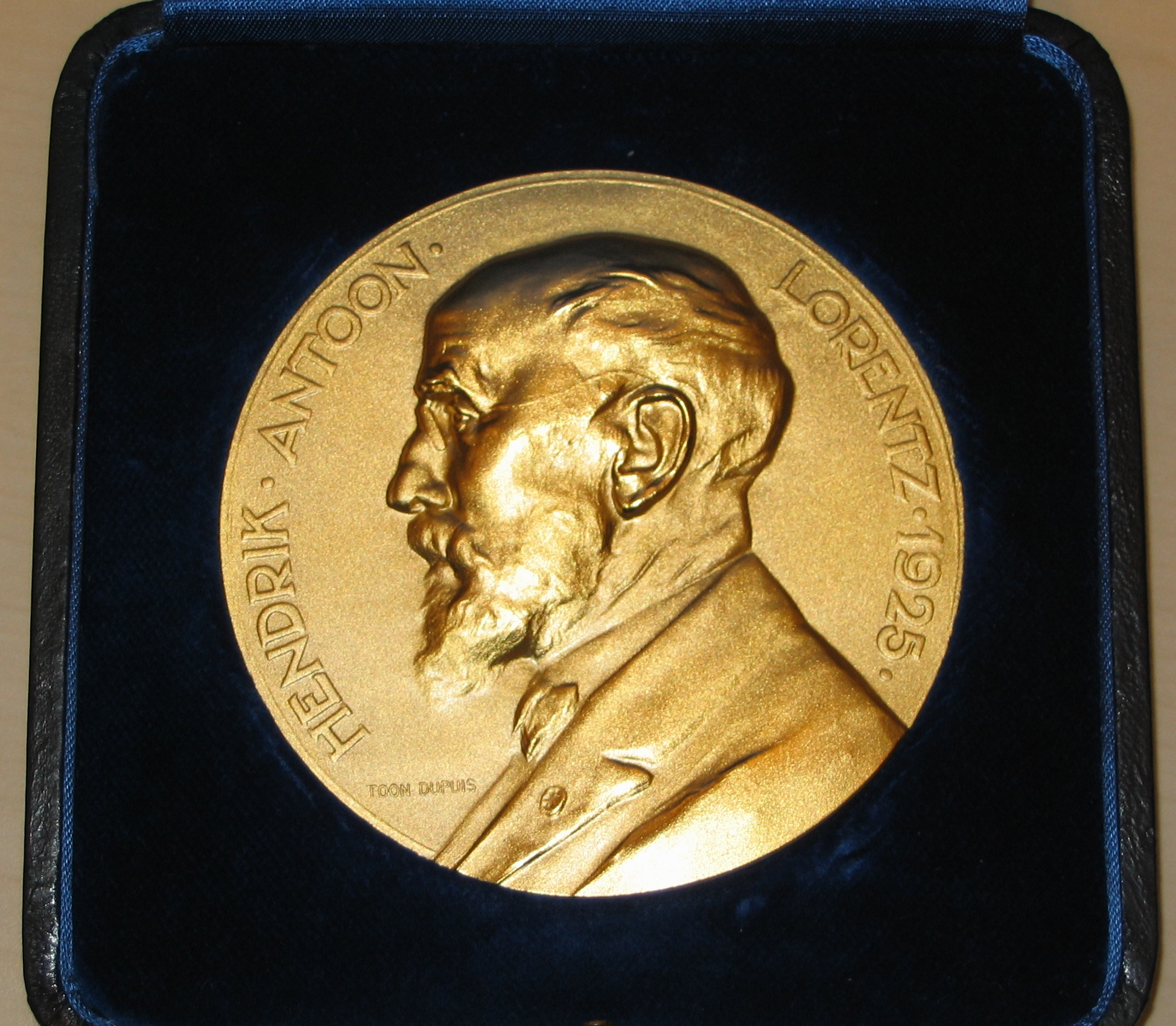

Lorentz Medal is a distinction awarded every four years by the Royal Netherlands Academy of Arts and Sciences. It was established in 1925 on the occasion of the 50th anniversary of the doctorate of Hendrik Lorentz. The medal is given for important contributions to theoretical physics, though in the past there have been some experimentalists among its recipients. The 2025 prize was anticipated by one year to celebrate the centennial.

The first winner, Max Planck, was personally selected by Lorentz. Eleven of the 25 award winners later received a Nobel Prize. The Lorentz medal is ranked fifth in a list of most prestigious international academic awards in physics.

== Recipients ==
Year	Recipients
2025	Charles L. Kane
2022	Daan Frenkel
2018	Juan M. Maldacena
2014	Michael Berry
2010	Edward Witten
2006	Leo P. Kadanoff
2002	Frank Wilczek
1998	Carl E. Wieman and Eric A. Cornell
1994	Alexander Polyakov
1990	Pierre-Gilles de Gennes
1986	Gerard 't Hooft
1982	Anatole Abragam
1978	Nicolaas Bloembergen
1974	John H. van Vleck
1970	George Uhlenbeck
1966	Freeman J. Dyson
1962	Rudolf E. Peierls
1958	Lars Onsager
1953	Fritz London
1947	Hendrik A. Kramers
1939	Arnold Sommerfeld
1935	Peter Debye
1931	Wolfgang Pauli
1927	Max Planck

== See also ==
- List of physics awards
