= Quantum spin Hall effect =

Proposed state of matter in semiconductors

The quantum spin Hall state is a state of matter in two-dimensional semiconductors that have a quantized spin-Hall conductance and a vanishing charge-Hall conductance. The quantum spin Hall state of matter is the cousin of the integer quantum Hall state, and does not require the application of a large magnetic field. The quantum spin Hall state does not break charge conservation symmetry and spin-$S_z$ conservation symmetry (in order to have well defined Hall conductances).

== Description ==
The first proposal for the existence of a quantum spin Hall state was developed by Charles Kane and Gene Mele who adapted an earlier model for graphene by F. Duncan M. Haldane which exhibits an integer quantum Hall effect. The Kane and Mele model is two copies of the Haldane model such that the spin up electron exhibits a chiral integer quantum Hall Effect while the spin down electron exhibits an anti-chiral integer quantum Hall effect. A relativistic version of the quantum spin Hall effect was introduced in the 1990s for the numerical simulation of chiral gauge theories; the simplest example consisting of a parity and time reversal symmetric U(1) gauge theory with bulk fermions of opposite sign mass, a massless Dirac surface mode, and bulk currents that carry chirality but not charge (the spin Hall current analogue). Overall the Kane-Mele model has a charge-Hall conductance of exactly zero but a spin-Hall conductance of exactly $\sigma_{xy}^\text{spin}=2$ (in units of $\frac{e}{4 \pi}$). Independently, a quantum spin Hall model was proposed by Andrei Bernevig and Shoucheng Zhang in an intricate strain architecture which engineers, due to spin-orbit coupling, a magnetic field pointing upwards for spin-up electrons and a magnetic field pointing downwards for spin-down electrons. The main ingredient is the existence of spin–orbit coupling, which can be understood as a momentum-dependent magnetic field coupling to the spin of the electron.

Real experimental systems, however, are far from the idealized picture presented above in which spin-up and spin-down electrons are not coupled. A very important achievement was the realization that the quantum spin Hall state remains to be non-trivial even after the introduction of spin-up spin-down scattering, which destroys the quantum spin Hall effect. In a separate paper, Kane and Mele introduced a topological $\mathbb{Z}_2$ invariant which characterizes a state as trivial or non-trivial band insulator (regardless if the state exhibits or does not exhibit a quantum spin Hall effect). Further stability studies of the edge liquid through which conduction takes place in the quantum spin Hall state proved, both analytically and numerically that the non-trivial state is robust to both interactions and extra spin-orbit coupling terms that mix spin-up and spin-down electrons. Such a non-trivial state (exhibiting or not exhibiting a quantum spin Hall effect) is called a topological insulator, which is an example of symmetry-protected topological order protected by charge conservation symmetry and time reversal symmetry. (Note that the quantum spin Hall state is also a symmetry-protected topological state protected by charge conservation symmetry and spin-$S_z$ conservation symmetry. We do not need time reversal symmetry to protect quantum spin Hall state. Topological insulator and quantum spin Hall state are different symmetry-protected topological states. So topological insulator and quantum spin Hall state are different states of matter.)

== In HgTe quantum wells ==
Since graphene has extremely weak spin-orbit coupling, it is very unlikely to support a quantum spin Hall state at temperatures achievable with today's technologies. Two-dimensional topological insulators (also known as the quantum spin Hall insulators) with one-dimensional helical edge states were predicted in 2006 by Bernevig, Hughes and Zhang to occur in quantum wells (very thin layers) of mercury telluride sandwiched between cadmium telluride, and were observed in 2007.

Different quantum wells of varying HgTe thickness can be built. When the sheet of HgTe in between the CdTe is thin, the system behaves like an ordinary insulator and does not conduct when the Fermi level resides in the band-gap. When the sheet of HgTe is varied and made thicker (this requires the fabrication of separate quantum wells), an interesting phenomenon happens. Due to the inverted band structure of HgTe, at some critical HgTe thickness, a Lifshitz transition occurs in which the system closes the bulk band gap to become a semi-metal, and then re-opens it to become a quantum spin Hall insulator.

In the gap closing and re-opening process, two edge states are brought out from the bulk and cross the bulk-gap. As such, when the Fermi level resides in the bulk gap, the conduction is dominated by the edge channels that cross the gap. The two-terminal conductance is $G_{xx}=2 \frac{e^2}{h}$ in the quantum spin Hall state and zero in the normal insulating state. As the conduction is dominated by the edge channels, the value of the conductance should be insensitive to how wide the sample is. A magnetic field should destroy the quantum spin Hall state by breaking time-reversal invariance and allowing spin-up spin-down electron scattering processes at the edge. All these predictions have been experimentally verified in an experiment performed in the Molenkamp labs at Universität Würzburg in Germany.

== See also ==
- Spin Hall effect
- Quantum Hall effect
