= Clare Waterman =

American cell biologist

Clare M. Waterman
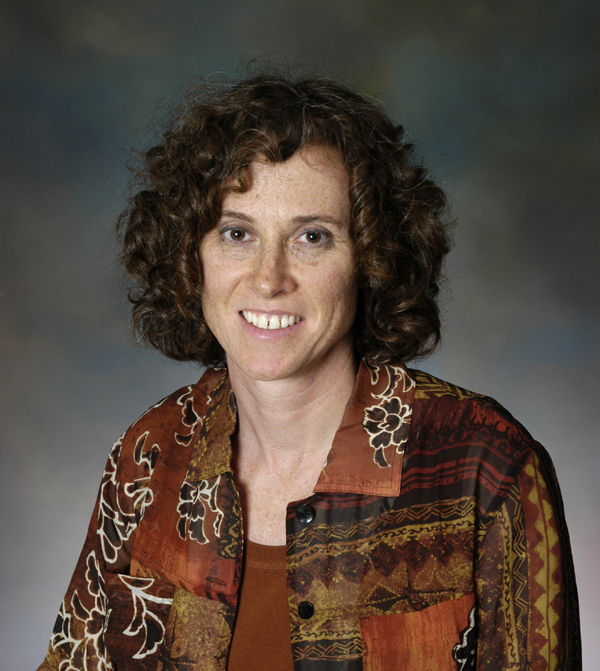
- Known for: Development of novel experimental techniques for the study of cellular components such as the cytoskeleton and the extracellular matrix.
- Awards: Member, National Academy of Sciences, 2018 Sackler International prize in Biophysics NIH Director’s Pioneer Award Arthur S. Flemming Award for Public Service
- Scientific career
- Fields: Cell and Molecular Biology
- Institutions: Mount Holyoke College University of Massachusetts University of Pennsylvania Scripps Research Institute National Heart, Lung and Blood Institute

Clare M. Waterman is a cell biologist who has worked on understanding the role of the cytoskeleton in cell migration. Waterman is a Distinguished Investigator, Chief of the Laboratory of Cell and Tissue Morphodynamics, and Director of the Cell and Developmental Biology Center at the National Heart, Lung, and Blood Institute (NHLBI), in the National Institutes of Health (NIH) in Bethesda MD, USA. Waterman has received several awards and honors, including the Sackler International prize in Biophysics, the NIH Director’s Pioneer Award, and the Arthur S. Flemming Award for Public Service. In 2018, she was elected to the National Academy of Sciences. She currently serves on the editorial boards of eLife, Current Biology and Journal of Microscopy.

== Early life and education ==
Waterman was born in Pittsburgh, Pennsylvania, and raised in Baltimore, Maryland. Waterman received her Bachelor of Arts in biochemistry in 1989 from Mount Holyoke College. She received her M.S. in exercise science from the University of Massachusetts Amherst prior to obtaining her Ph.D. in cell biology from the University of Pennsylvania in 1995. After completing post-doctoral training at the University of North Carolina in Chapel Hill in 1999, she joined the Department of Cell Biology at the Scripps Research Institute in La Jolla, California. Once Waterman obtained tenure at Scripps as an associate professor, she then joined the National Heart, Lung, and Blood Institute (NHLBI) in 2007, where her main interests are cellular and developmental biology and biophysics and computational biology.

== Research interests ==
Waterman has made fundamental advances in the understanding of the molecular and biophysical basis of cellular motility and migration. Such events are of critical importance in development (mainly in the vascular and nervous systems), the immune response and wound healing, embryogenesis, as well as in metastatic cancer. Dr. Waterman’s past work consists of novel findings related to the development of experimental approaches, and the cytoskeletal elements of a cell, including microtubules and actin, integrin adhesion molecules, and the extracellular matrix. Waterman invented Fluorescent Speckle Microscopy (FSM) which is used to understand the self-organization of proteins at the cellular level. This invention has helped researchers develop an idea of how the self-organization of macromolecule proteins can drive cell shape and mobility. At the NHLBI, Waterman leads the Cell and Tissue Morphodynamics laboratory, where she works alongside cell biologists, physicists, mathematicians, engineers, and mouse geneticists Waterman has also authored and coauthored more than 90 papers.

== Honors and awards ==
2002 – Women in Cell Biology Career Recognition Award (American Society for Cell Biology)

2005 – NIH Director’s Pioneer Award

2006 – R.R. Bensley Award in Cell Biology (American Association of Anatomists)

2007 – Sackler International prize in Biophysics

2012 – Arthur S. Flemming Award for Public Service (George Washington University)

2014 – Lillie Award for Collaborative Research (UChicago-MBL)

2015 – Council member of the Gordon Research Conferences Organization

2018 – Inducted to the National Academy of Sciences
