= Charles L. Kane =

American physicist (born 1963)

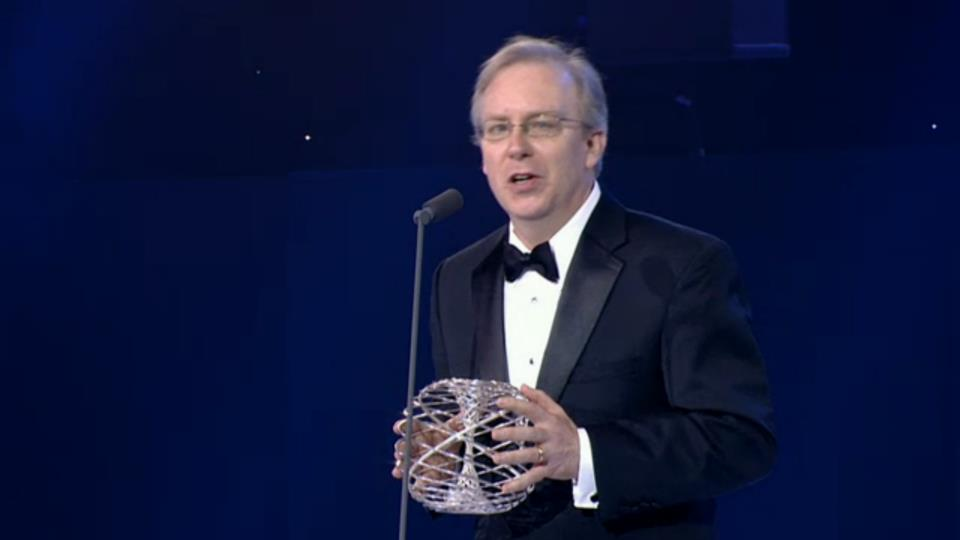
- Kane receiving the Physics Frontiers prizes in 2013
- Born: January 12, 1963 (age 63)
- Education: Massachusetts Institute of Technology, University of Chicago
- Spouse: Suzanne Amador Kane
- Awards: Dirac Prize (2012); Oliver E. Buckley Prize (2012); Physics Frontiers Prize (2013); Franklin Medal (2015); Fontiers of Knowledge Award (2018); Breakthrough Prize in Fundamental Physics (2019); John Scott Medal (2019); Lorentz Medal (2026)
- Scientific career
- Fields: Theoretical condensed matter physics
- Workplaces: University of Pennsylvania
- Academic advisors: Patrick A. Lee

Charles L. Kane (Charles Lewis Kane; born January 12, 1963) is a theoretical condensed matter physicist and is the Christopher H. Browne Distinguished Professor of Physics at the University of Pennsylvania. He completed a B.S. in physics at the University of Chicago in 1985 and his Ph.D. at Massachusetts Institute of Technology in 1989. Prior to joining the faculty at the University of Pennsylvania he was a postdoctoral associate at IBM's T. J. Watson Research Center working with his mentor Matthew P. A. Fisher, among others.

Kane is notable for theoretically predicting the quantum spin Hall effect (originally in graphene) and what would later be known as topological insulators.

He received the 2012 Dirac Prize, along with Shoucheng Zhang and Duncan Haldane, for their groundbreaking work on two- and three-dimensional topological insulators. In the same year he was also chosen for the inaugural class of Mathematics and the Physical Sciences Simons Investigators. He also shared one of the 2013 Physics Frontiers prizes with Laurens W. Molenkamp and Shoucheng Zhang for their work on topological insulators. In 2018, he shared the Frontiers of Knowledge Award with Eugene J. Mele. In 2019, was recognized with Breakthrough Prize in Fundamental Physics with fellow University of Pennsylvania professor Eugene Mele. In 2025, he received the Lorentz Medal, again for work on topological insulators.
