= Alfred Mueller =

American theoretical physicist

Alfred H. Mueller
- Born: June 9, 1939 (age 87); Chicago
- Education: Iowa State University; Massachusetts Institute of Technology
- Awards: J.J. Sakurai Prize for Theoretical Particle Physics (2003)
- Scientific career
- Fields: Physics
- Workplaces: Columbia University; SLAC
- Doctoral students: Yuri Kovchegov

Alfred H. Mueller (born June 9, 1939) is an American theoretical physicist, and the Enrico Fermi Professor of Physics at Columbia University.

Mueller studied at Iowa State University, receiving a bachelor's degree in 1961 and in 1965 completed his PhD at MIT. He then served until 1971 as a post-doc at Brookhaven National Laboratory. Since 1972 he has been at Columbia University. He was also a visiting scientist at the Institute for Advanced Study (1975), at the nuclear research centers in Saclay, the Kavli Institute for Theoretical Physics at the University of California, Santa Barbara, New York University, and at SLAC.

Among other subjects, Mueller studied the high-order perturbation theory of quantum chromodynamics (QCD) and tests of QCD "hard" scattering processes of hadrons and QCD in nuclear physics and heavy ion collisions. Mueller is a founding father of the field of parton saturation, a theoretically well established idea that the occupation numbers of small-x quarks and gluons cannot become arbitrarily large in the wave function of a hadron or nucleus.

He was a Sloan Research Fellow in 1972 and a Guggenheim Fellow in 1988. In 2003 he received with George Sterman the Sakurai Prize for the development of concepts of perturbative QCD.

Mueller is also a popular teacher amongst students at Columbia, where he currently teaches the graduate level Particle Physics course and the undergraduate Quantum Mechanics course.

== Writings ==
- with Dokshitzer, Khoze, Troyan: Basics of perturbative QCD. Edition Frontiers 1991
