= Antoine Georges =

French physicist

- Born: 14 April 1961 (age 65)
- Education: École Polytechnique, École Normale Supérieure
- Known for: Dynamical mean-field theory
- Awards: Aneesur Rahman Prize (2020); CNRS Silver Medal (2007); EPS Europhysics Prize (2006); Dargelos Prize (2004)
- Scientific career
- Fields: Physicist
- Workplaces: Princeton University; Ecole Normale Supérieure; Ecole Polytechnique; Collège de France; University of Geneva; Flatiron Institute, Simons Foundation

Antoine Georges (born 1961) is a French physicist. He is a professor at the Collège de France in Paris (where he holds the chair of Condensed Matter Physics) and the director of the Center for Computational Quantum Physics at the Flatiron Institute, New York. In 2023, he was elected to the National Academy of Sciences.

== Early life and education ==
Georges' interest in science began during his teenage years at his father's laboratory at the French Institute of Health and Medical Research. In 1983 he graduated from the École Polytechnique and joined École Normale Supérieure where he completed his PhD in 1988 (Pierre-Gilles de Gennes was the president of his PhD committee).

== Career ==
In 1989, he became a postdoctoral fellow at Princeton University in order to work on high-critical-temperature superconductors in the group of Phil Anderson. In the Fall of 1990, he started collaborating with Gabriel Kotliar who had recently joined Rutgers University and together they developed today's formulation of Dynamical Mean Field Theory by mapping it onto the self-consistent solution of a quantum impurity model. He also worked with Anirvan Sengupta on Kondo effects and performed theoretical work on spin glasses and quantum spin liquids along with Olivier Parcollet and Subir Sachdev. He returned to Ecole Normale Supérieure in 1991 as a researcher with the Centre National de la Recherche Scientifique and an adjunct professor at Ecole Polytechnique.

In 2003, he was appointed full professor at Ecole Polytechnique and relocated there, creating a research group in theoretical condensed matter physics at the Centre de Physique Théorique. He was the chair of the physics department of Ecole Polytechnique from 2006 to 2009. In 2009, he was elected a professor at the Collège de France on the chair of condensed matter physics.

In 2010 he was named Sommerfeld lecturer by LMU Munich and in 2011 became Schrödinger lecturer at the ETH Zurich. The same year he became a part-time professor at the University of Geneva and prior to all of it, he was a recipient of the Dargelos Prize in 2004 from his alma mater. In 2006 he was awarded the Europhysics Prize in condensed matter and next year he was honoured with a CNRS Silver Medal. He has been jointly awarded the 2022 Feenberg Memorial Medal with Gabriel Kotliar and Dieter Vollhardt for work that has significantly advanced the field of many-body physics.
