= Yuri Kovchegov =

American physicist

Yuri Kovchegov (born 1973) is an American physicist.

== Biography ==
Kovchegov obtained his bachelor's degree from the Moscow Institute of Physics and Technology in 1993 and two years later got his master's from Columbia University following by Ph.D. in 1998 at the same place. From 1998 to 1999 he worked at the University of Minnesota as a postdoc and then became theoretical research associate at Brookhaven National Laboratory. From 2000 to 2004 he served as a research assistant professor at the University of Washington and then became Ohio State University's assistant professor in 2004 following by a promotion there to the associate professor in 2008 and to the professor in 2012. In August 2001 he was awarded travel award from the National Science Foundation and on May 21, 2006 he was awarded Raymond and Beverly Sackler Prize. He is also a fellow at the American Physical Society.

== Research ==
On September 28, 1998 he along with A.H. Mueller used the formula $-\frac{1}{4}G^a_{\mu \nu} G^{\mu \nu}_a$ to calculate the production of gluons.

== Writings ==
- with Eugene Levin: Quantum Chromodynamics at High Energy. Cambridge University Press 2012.
