= Daan Frenkel =

Dutch physicist (born 1948)

Daan Frenkel ForMemRS MAE
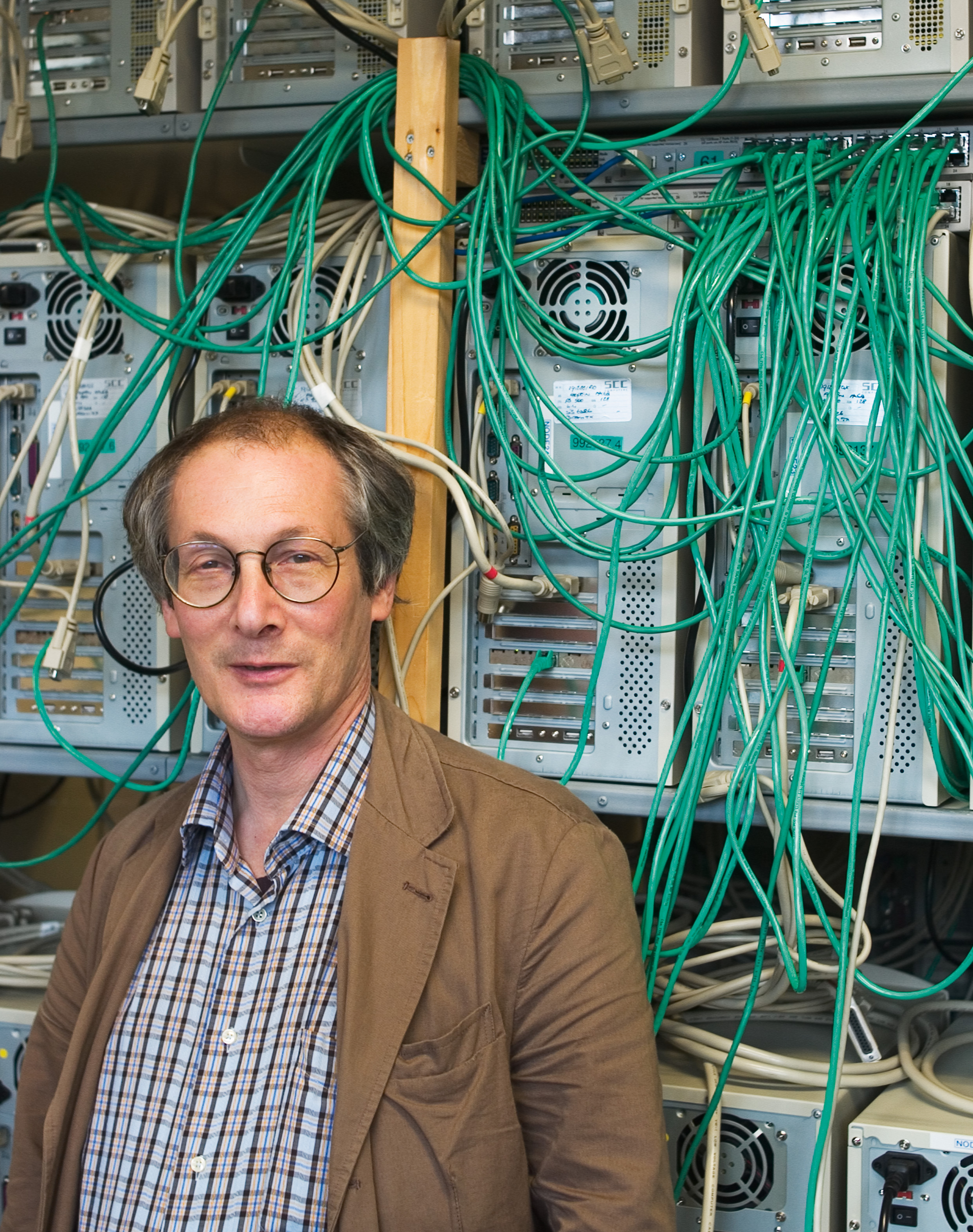
- Frenkel in 2000
- Born: 1948 (age 77–78); Amsterdam
- Education: University of Amsterdam (PhD)
- Known for: Noro–Frenkel law of corresponding states
- Awards: Spinoza Prize (2000); ForMemRS (2006); Aneesur Rahman Prize (2007); Fritz London Memorial Lecture (2011); Boltzmann Medal (2016); Lorentz Medal (2022)
- Scientific career
- Workplaces: University of Cambridge; Royal Dutch Shell; University of Utrecht; University of California, Los Angeles
- Thesis: Rotational relaxation of linear molecules in dense noble gases (1977)
- Doctoral students: Marjolein Dijkstra
- Website: www.ch.cam.ac.uk/staff/df.html

Daan Frenkel ForMemRS MAE (born 1948, Amsterdam) is a Dutch computational physicist in the Department of Chemistry at the University of Cambridge.

== Education ==
Frenkel completed his PhD at the University of Amsterdam in 1977 in experimental physical chemistry.

== Career and research ==
Frenkel worked as postdoctoral research fellow in the Chemistry and Biochemistry Department at the University of California, Los Angeles (UCLA), subsequently at Shell and at the University of Utrecht.

Between 1987 and 2007, Frenkel carried out his research at the FOM Institute for Atomic and Molecular Physics (AMOLF) in Amsterdam where he has been employed since 1987. In the same period, he was appointed (part-time) professor at the Universities of Utrecht and Amsterdam. From 2011 to 2015 he was Head of the Department of Chemistry at the University of Cambridge. Since 2007 he is a Professor of Chemistry at the University of Cambridge.

Frenkel has co-authored together with Berend Smit Understanding Molecular Simulation, which has grown into a handbook used worldwide by aspiring computational physicists.

=== Awards and honours ===
In 2000 he was one of three winners of the Dutch Spinoza Prize. In 2008 he was appointed a Fellow of Trinity College, Cambridge. He is a member of the Royal Netherlands Academy of Arts and Sciences (1998), the American Academy of Arts and Sciences (2008), and The World Academy of Sciences (TWAS) in 2012. He was elected a Foreign Member of the Royal Society (ForMemRS) in 2006. In 2016 he was elected as a foreign associate of the National Academy of Sciences. In 2007 he received the Aneesur Rahman Prize from the American Physical Society (APS) and the Berni J Alder CECAM prize. In 2010 he received the Soft Matter and Biophysical Chemistry Award from the Royal Society of Chemistry (RSC), UK.

He received the 2016 Boltzmann Medal and the 2022 Lorentz Medal. Asteroid 12651 Frenkel, discovered by astronomers during the third Palomar–Leiden trojan survey in 1977, was named in his honor in 2018.
