= Auke Bloembergen =

Dutch jurist and legal scholar (1927–2016)

Auke Reitze Bloembergen (28 August 1927 – 1 November 2016) was a Dutch jurist and legal scholar. He was a professor of civil law at Leiden University from 1965 to 1979. Bloembergen was a justice at the Supreme Court of the Netherlands from 1979 to 1993.

== Career ==
Bloembergen was born in De Bilt on 28 August 1927. He was one of six children born to Auke Bloembergen senior and Rie Quint. One of his siblings being the Nobel-laureate physicist Nicolaas Bloembergen. In 1949 Bloembergen graduated with a law degree from Utrecht University. After compulsory military service for two years he became a lawyer in The Hague. In 1957 he quit his position and became a scientific employee at Utrecht University which he remained until 1965. Between 1962 and 1966 he also served as substitute judge at the Utrecht arrondissement. Bloembergen earned his PhD cum laude under S.N. van Opstall at Utrecht University in 1965 with a thesis titled Schadevergoeding bij onrechtmatige daad. He was subsequently appointed as professor of civil law at Leiden University. Bloembergen stayed on until 1979. He also served as substitute judge at the Rotterdam arrondissement from 1966 to 1975. He was a fellow at the Netherlands Institute for Advanced Study between 1975 and 1976, where he did research on the relation between administrative and private law.

In 1979 Bloembergen was appointed a Supreme Court of the Netherlands justice. He stayed on until 1993, and continued four more years in extraordinary service. Concurrently he served as member of the Council of State in extraordinary service from 1984 to 1989. Bloembergen is regarded as one of the first Dutch academic jurists proposing reforms in the system of compensation related to court cases.

Bloembergen was elected a member of the Royal Netherlands Academy of Arts and Sciences in 1991.

Bloembergen died in Wassenaar on 1 November 2016.
