= Nicolaas Bloembergen =

Dutch–American physicist (1920–2017)

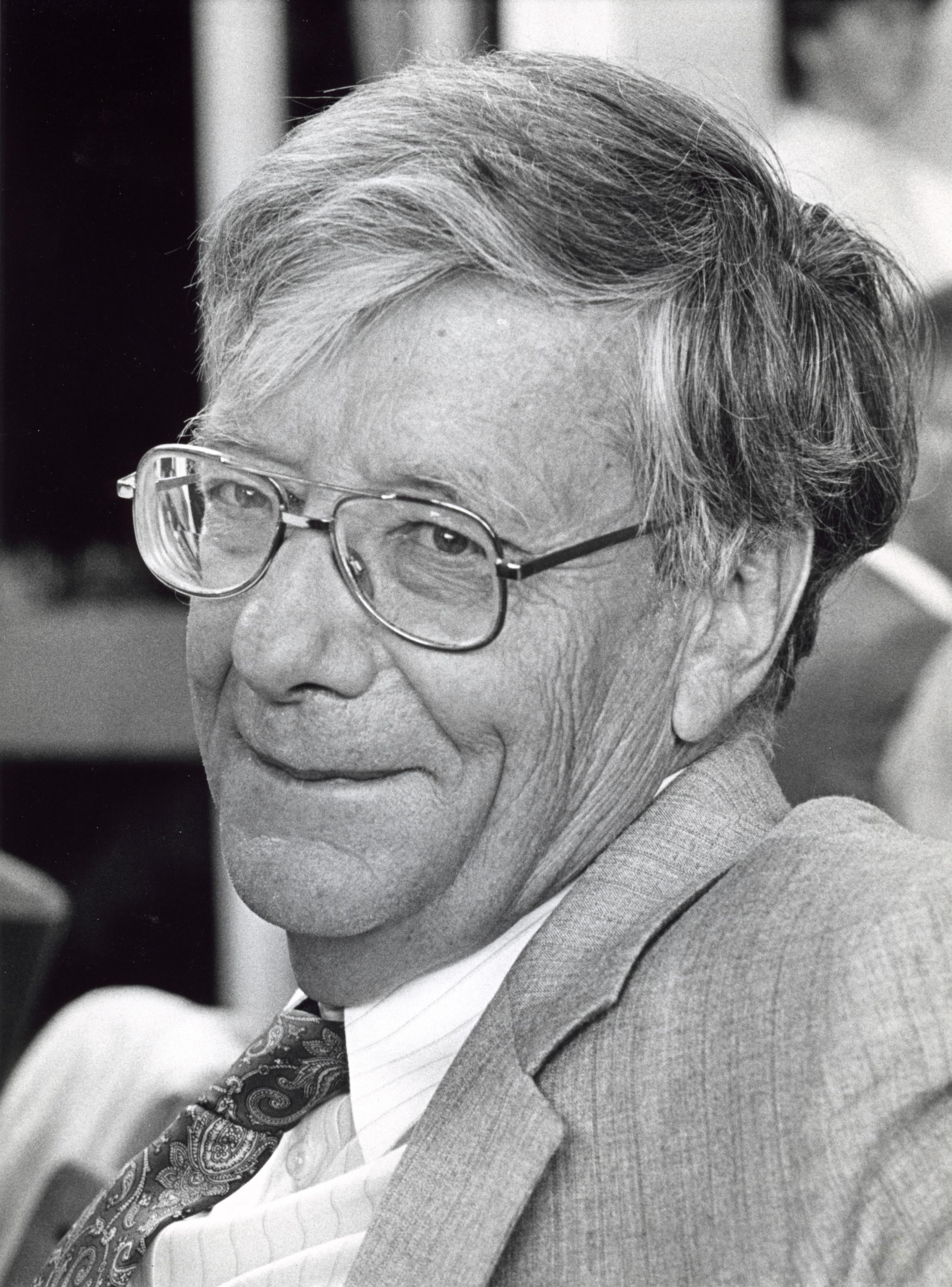
- Bloembergen in 1981
- Born: March 11, 1920; Dordrecht, Netherlands
- Died: September 5, 2017 (aged 97); Tucson, Arizona, U.S.
- Citizenship: Netherlands; United States (nat. 1958)
- Education: Utrecht University (grad. 1941, 1943); Leiden University (grad. 1948)
- Known for: Atomic line filter; BPP theory; Motional narrowing; Nonlinear optics; Photon upconversion; Second-harmonic generation
- Spouse: Huberta Deliana Brink (m. 1950)
- Awards: Oliver E. Buckley Condensed Matter Prize (1958); Stuart Ballantine Medal (1961); National Medal of Science (1974); Lorentz Medal (1978); Nobel Prize in Physics (1981); IEEE Medal of Honor (1983)
- Scientific career
- Fields: Physics
- Workplaces: Harvard University; University of Arizona
- Doctoral advisors: Cornelis Jacobus Gorter; Edward Mills Purcell
- Doctoral students: Peter Pershan; Yuen-Ron Shen; Eli Yablonovitch

Nicolaas Bloembergen (March 11, 1920 – September 5, 2017) was a Dutch–American physicist recognized for his work in developing driving principles behind nonlinear optics for laser spectroscopy. During his career, he was a professor at Harvard University and later at the University of Arizona and at Leiden University in 1973 (as Lorentz Professor).

Bloembergen shared the 1981 Nobel Prize in Physics along with Arthur Schawlow and Kai Siegbahn because their work "has had a profound effect on our present knowledge of the constitution of matter" through the use of laser spectroscopy. In particular, Bloembergen was singled out because he "founded a new field of science we now call non-linear optics" by mixing "two or more beams of laser light... in order to produce laser light of a different wave length" and thus significantly broaden the laser spectroscopy frequency band.

== Education ==
Nicolaas Bloembergen was born on March 11, 1920, in Dordrecht, Netherlands, where his father was a chemical engineer and executive. He had five siblings, with his brother Auke later becoming a legal scholar. Bloembergen entered Utrecht University in 1938 to study physics, receiving his C.Phil. in 1941 and his doctorandus in 1943. In 1943, during the German occupation of the Netherlands, the German authorities closed the University and Bloembergen spent two years in hiding.

Bloembergen left the war-ravaged Netherlands in 1945 to pursue graduate studies at Harvard University under Professor Edward Mills Purcell. Through Purcell, Bloembergen was part of the prolific academic lineage tree of J. J. Thomson, which includes many other Nobel Laureates, beginning with Thomson himself (Physics Nobel, 1906) and Lord Rayleigh (Physics Nobel, 1904), Ernest Rutherford (Chemistry Nobel 1908), Owen Richardson (Physics Nobel, 1928), and finally Purcell (Physics, Nobel 1952). Bloembergen's other influences include John Van Vleck (Physics Nobel, 1977) and Percy Bridgman (Physics Nobel, 1946).

Six weeks before his arrival, Purcell and his graduate students Torrey and Pound discovered nuclear magnetic resonance (NMR). Bloembergen was hired to develop the first NMR machine. At Harvard he attended lectures by Schwinger, Van Vleck, and Kemble. Bloembergen's NMR systems are the predecessors of modern-day MRI machines, which are used to examine internal organs and tissues. Bloembergen's research on NMR led to an interest in masers, which were introduced in 1953 and are the predecessors of lasers.

Bloembergen returned to the Netherlands in 1947, and submitted his doctoral thesis, Nuclear Magnetic Relaxation, at Leiden University. This was because he had completed all the preliminary examinations in the Netherlands, and Cornelis Jacobus Gorter of Leiden offered him a postdoctoral appointment there. He received his Ph.D. from Leiden in 1948, and then was a postdoc at Leiden for about a year.

== Career ==
In 1949, Bloembergen returned to Harvard as a junior fellow of the Society of Fellows. In 1951, he became an associate professor; he then became Gordon McKay Professor of Applied Physics in 1957; Rumford Professor of Physics in 1974; and Gerhard Gade University Professor in 1980. He retired from Harvard in 1990.

In addition, Bloembergen served as a visiting professor. From 1964 to 1965, Bloembergen was a visiting professor at the University of California, Berkeley. In 1996–1997, he was a visiting scientist in the Optical Sciences Center at the University of Arizona; he became a professor at Arizona in 2001. Bloembergen was a member of the board of sponsors of the Bulletin of the Atomic Scientists and honorary editor of the Journal of Nonlinear Optical Physics & Materials.

== Research ==
By 1960 while at Harvard, Bloembergen experimented with microwave spectroscopy. He had modified the maser of Charles Townes, and in 1956, he developed a crystal maser, which was more powerful than the standard gaseous version.

With the advent of the laser, Bloembergen participated in the development of the field of laser spectroscopy, which allows precise observations of atomic structure using lasers. Following the development of second-harmonic generation by Peter Franken and others in 1961, Bloembergen studied how a new structure of matter is revealed, when one bombards matter with a focused and high-intensity beam of photons. This he termed the study of nonlinear optics. In reflection to his work in a Dutch newspaper in 1990, Bloembergen said: "We took a standard textbook on optics and for each section we asked ourselves what would happen if the intensity was to become very high. We were almost certain that we were bound to encounter an entirely new type of physics within that domain".

From this theoretical work, Bloembergen found ways to combine two or more laser sources consisting of photons in the visible light frequency range to generate a single laser source with photons of different frequencies in the infrared and ultraviolet ranges, which extends the amount of atomic detail that can be gathered from laser spectroscopy.

== Personal life and death ==
Bloembergen met Huberta Deliana "Deli" Brink in 1948 while on vacation with his university's Physics Club. She was able to travel with him to the United States in 1949 on a student hospitality exchange program; he proposed to her when they arrived in the States, and were married by 1950 on return to Amsterdam. They both became naturalized U.S. citizens in 1958. They had three children.

Bloembergen died on September 5, 2017, at an assisted living facility in his hometown Tucson, Arizona, of cardiorespiratory failure at the age of 97. His wife died on June 19, 2019.

== Biography ==
In 2016 a Dutch biography was published, and in 2019 an English one.

== Recognition ==
=== Memberships ===
Year	Organization	Type	Ref.
1955	(United States) American Physical Society	Fellow	
1956	(United States) American Academy of Arts and Sciences	Member	
1956	Royal Netherlands Academy of Arts and Sciences	Corresponding Member	
1960	(United States) National Academy of Sciences	Member	
1978	(India) Indian Academy of Sciences	Honorary Fellow	
1981	(France) French Academy of Sciences	Foreign Associate	
1982	(United States) American Philosophical Society	Member	
1983	(East Germany) German National Academy of Sciences Leopoldina	Member	
1984	(United States) Optical Society of America	Honorary Member	
1984	(United States) National Academy of Engineering	Emeritus	

=== Awards ===
Year	Organization	Award	Citation	Ref.
1958	(United States) American Physical Society	Oliver E. Buckley Prize	"For his studies of magnetic resonance, both nuclear and electronic and of its uses in the investigation of solids, liquids and gases."	
1959	(United States) Institute of Radio Engineers	IRE Morris Liebmann Memorial Prize (Note: Shared with Charles Townes.)	"For fundamental and original contributions to the maser."	
1961	(United States) Franklin Institute	Stuart Ballantine Medal	—	
1978	Royal Netherlands Academy of Arts and Sciences	Lorentz Medal	—	
1979	(United States) Optical Society of America	Frederic Ives Medal	"In recognition of his achievement in establishing the theoretical framework of nonlinear optics, his sustained innovative contributions to the exploration of all aspects in the field of nonlinear optical phenomena, and his successes in the role of teacher and interpreter of science."	
1981	(Sweden) Royal Swedish Academy of Sciences	Nobel Prize in Physics (Note: Shared with Arthur Schawlow and Kai Siegbahn.)	"For their contribution to the development of laser spectroscopy."	
1983	(United States) IEEE	IEEE Medal of Honor	"For pioneering contributions to Quantum Electronics including the invention of the three-level maser."	

=== National awards ===
Year	Head of state	Award	Citation	Ref.
1974	(United States) Gerald Ford	National Medal of Science	"For pioneering applications of magnetic resonance to the study of condnesed [sic] matter and for subsequent scientific investigations and inventions concerning the interaction of amtter [sic] with coherent radiation."	

=== Honorary degrees ===
Year	University	Degree	Ref.
1996	(United States) University of Central Florida	—	
1998	(United States) North Carolina State University	Doctor of Science	
2000	(United States) Harvard University	Doctor of Science	

== Legacy ==
On March 11, 2020, the day of Bloembergen's 100th birthday, a team of researchers at the University of New South Wales published an article in Nature, demonstrating for the first time the successful coherent control of the nucleus of a single atom using only electric fields, an idea first proposed by Bloembergen back in 1961.
