= B. Andrei Bernevig =

Romanian physicist (born 1978)

Bogdan Andrei Bernevig (born 1978 in Bucharest) is a Romanian professor of condensed matter physics at Princeton University. His research focuses on topological insulators and other topological quantum materials. His work has been awarded numerous prizes, including the 2019 James C. McGroddy Prize of the American Physical Society and the 2023 EPS Europhysics Prize.

== Biography ==
Andrei Bernevig took part in the Physics Olympiad in Bucharest from 1994 to 1997 as a teenager (and won international gold and silver medals). He graduated from Stanford University (bachelor's degree in physics and master's degree in mathematics in 2001) and received his PhD from Stanford University under Shoucheng Zhang. As a postdoctoral fellow he went to the Center for Theoretical Physics at Princeton University, where he was appointed Assistant Professor in 2009 and Associate Professor in 2014.

He deals with the application of topology in solid state physics, for example in the fractional quantum hall effect, and novel topological materials (topological insulators, topological superconductors) and spin transport or spintronics. He also deals with ferrous high-temperature superconductors and predicted s-wave pairing there.

== Awards ==
In 2016 he received the New Horizons in Physics Prize. In 2014 he received the Sackler Prize. In 2017 he was awarded a Guggenheim Fellowship and, in 2018, an Alexander von Humboldt Professorship. In 2019 he was awarded the James C. McGroddy Prize for New Materials from the American Physical Society. He was named a Fellow of the American Physical Society in 2022 "for broad and significant contributions to the discovery and understanding of new topological quantum phases". He was awarded the 2023 EPS Europhysics Prize jointly with Claudia Felser for their contributions "in the classification, prediction, and discovery of novel topological quantum materials".

== Selected publications ==
- Koralek, J. D.; Weber, C. P.; Orenstein, J.; Bernevig, B. A.; Zhang, Shou-Cheng; Mack, S.; Awschalom, D. D. (2009). "Emergence of the persistent spin helix in semiconductor quantum wells". Nature. 458 (7238): 610–613. arXiv:0903.4709. Bibcode:2009Natur.458..610K. doi:10.1038/nature07871. ISSN 0028-0836. PMID 19340077. S2CID 62257.
- Bernevig, B. Andrei; Hughes, Taylor L.; Zhang, Shou-Cheng (15 December 2006). "Quantum Spin Hall Effect and Topological Phase Transition in HgTe Quantum Wells". Science. 314 (5806): 1757–1761. arXiv:cond-mat/0611399. Bibcode:2006Sci...314.1757B. doi:10.1126/science.1133734. ISSN 0036-8075. PMID 17170299. S2CID 7295726.
- Bernevig, B. Andrei; Haldane, F. D. M. (19 June 2008). "Model Fractional Quantum Hall States and Jack Polynomials". Physical Review Letters. 100 (24) 246802. arXiv:0707.3637. Bibcode:2008PhRvL.100x6802B. doi:10.1103/physrevlett.100.246802. ISSN 0031-9007. PMID 18643608. S2CID 30116999.
- Bernevig, B. Andrei; Orenstein, J.; Zhang, Shou-Cheng (4 December 2006). "Exact SU(2) Symmetry and Persistent Spin Helix in a Spin-Orbit Coupled System". Physical Review Letters. 97 (23) 236601. arXiv:cond-mat/0606196. Bibcode:2006PhRvL..97w6601B. doi:10.1103/physrevlett.97.236601. ISSN 0031-9007. PMID 17280220. S2CID 28319554.
- B. A. Bernevig and S.-C. Zhang, Quantum Spin Hall Effect Phys. Rev. Lett. 96, 106802 (2006)
- Seo, Kangjun; Bernevig, B. Andrei; Hu, Jiangping (14 November 2008). "Pairing Symmetry in a Two-Orbital Exchange Coupling Model of Oxypnictides". Physical Review Letters. 101 (20) 206404. arXiv:0805.2958. Bibcode:2008PhRvL.101t6404S. doi:10.1103/physrevlett.101.206404. ISSN 0031-9007. PMID 19113362. S2CID 14824421.
- Bernevig, B. A.; Giuliano, D.; Laughlin, R. B. (9 April 2001). "Spinon Attraction in Spin-1/2Antiferromagnetic Chains". Physical Review Letters. 86 (15). American Physical Society (APS): 3392–3395. arXiv:cond-mat/0011069. Bibcode:2001PhRvL..86.3392B. doi:10.1103/physrevlett.86.3392. ISSN 0031-9007. PMID 11327978. S2CID 39501882.
- Parish, Meera M.; Hu, Jiangping; Bernevig, B. Andrei (23 October 2008). "Experimental consequences of thes-wavecos(kx)cos(ky)superconductivity in the iron pnictides". Physical Review B. 78 (14) 144514. arXiv:0807.4572. Bibcode:2008PhRvB..78n4514P. doi:10.1103/physrevb.78.144514. ISSN 1098-0121. S2CID 14469861.
