= Xiaoliang Qi =

Chinese physicist

- Born: July 1983 (age 42)
- Occupation: Physicist
- Years active: 2007-present
- Employer: Stanford University

Xiaoliang Qi (simplified Chinese: 祁晓亮; traditional Chinese: 祁曉亮; pinyin: Qí Xiǎoliàng; born July 1983) is a Chinese physicist and professor at Stanford University who studies quantum entanglement, quantum gravity, quantum chaos, and topological phenomena in condensed matter. He earned his B.S. in 2003 and Ph.D. in 2007 from Tsinghua University.

== Education and career ==
Qi earned a B.S. in Physics from Tsinghua University in 2003 and earned a Ph.D. in Physics at the Institute of Advanced Study in the same institution in 2007.

Qi was a research associate at Stanford Linear Accelerator Center from 2007 to 2009; following that, he was a postdoctoral researcher at Microsoft Station Q in UC Santa Barbara from 2009 to 2010. He was an assistant professor of physics at Stanford University from 2009 to 2014, an associate professor from 2014 to 2018, and a professor since 2019. From September 2017 to March 2018, he was a visiting scholar at the Institute for Advanced Study. His research group has pointed out the relationship between topological insulators in three space dimensions and axion electrodynamics.

== Awards and honors ==
- 2010 Sloan Fellowship
- 2011 Hermann Kümmel Early Achievement Award in Many-Body Physics
- 2011 Packard Fellowship
- 2012 NSF CAREER Award
- 2014 Sackler International Prize of Physics
- 2016 New Horizons in Physics Prize
- 2018 Simons Investigator

== Personal life ==
Qi lives in Palo Alto, California.

== See also ==
- Shoucheng Zhang
