= Marjolein Dijkstra =

Dutch condensed matter physicist

- Born: 1967 (age 58–59); The Hague
- Citizenship: Dutch
- Education: Utrecht University, Wageningen University
- Known for: Colloidal self-assembly Entropy Driven Phase Transitions
- Awards: Minerva Prize of the Netherlands Organisation for Scientific Research (2000)
- Scientific career
- Fields: Soft Matter; Materials Science
- Workplaces: Utrecht University
- Thesis: The effect of entropy on the stability and structure of complex fluids (1994)
- Doctoral advisor: Daan Frenkel
- Website: colloid.nl/people/marjolein-dijkstra/

Marjolein Dijkstra (born 1967) is a Dutch condensed matter physicist. She works as a professor at the Debye Institute for Nanomaterials Science at Utrecht University, in the Soft Condensed Matter group.

== Education and career ==
Dijkstra was born on 26 September 1967 in The Hague. She earned two master's degrees, one in molecular sciences in 1990 from Wageningen University under the supervision of Yehudi K. Levine and Tjeerd Schaafsma, and another in experimental physics in 1991 from Utrecht University under the supervision of Daan Frenkel. She completed her PhD in 1994, with Frenkel as her doctoral advisor. Her dissertation was The effect of entropy on the structure and stability of complex fluids.

After postdoctoral research at the University of Oxford with Paul Madden and Jean-Pierre Hansen, at the Shell Research and Technology Centre Amsterdam, and at Bristol University with Michael P. Allen and Robert Evans, she joined Utrecht University in 1999. She has been a full professor there since 2007, and was named director of the Debye Institute in 2015.

In spring 2020 Marjolein Dijkstra received an ERC Advanced Grant research funding for her project Rational Design of Soft Hierarchical Materials with Responsive Functionalities: Machine learning Soft Matter to create Soft Machines..

Dijkstra was awarded the 2025 Physica Prize, given to physicists working in the Netherlands by the Dutch Physical Society.

== Recognition ==
Dijkstra won the Minerva Prize of the Netherlands Organisation for Scientific Research in 2000. This prize is given every two years for the best publication by a female physicist; Dijkstra won it for her work with René van Roij and Robert Evans on "Phase diagram of highly asymmetric binary hard-sphere mixtures". Dijkstra was elected a member of the Royal Netherlands Academy of Arts and Sciences in 2020.
