= Mark L. Brongersma =

Dutch materials scientist and physicist

Mark Brongersma
- Born: 1969 (age 56–57); Netherlands
- Education: Utrecht University
- Known for: Nanophotonics, plasmonics
- Awards: NSF CAREER Award, Walter J. Gores Award for Excellence in Teaching, Raymond and Beverly Sackler Prize in the Physical Sciences
- Scientific career
- Fields: Optics, materials science
- Workplaces: AMOLF; Stanford University
- Thesis: Optical properties of ion beam synthesized Si nanocrystals in SiO2 (1998)
- Doctoral advisor: Albert Polman
- Other academic advisors: Harry Atwater

Mark Luitzen Brongersma (born 1969), is a Dutch physicist and materials scientist specializing in nanophotonics, plasmonics, metamaterials, and optoelectronics. He is the Stephen Harris Professor of Materials Science and Engineering and a professor, by courtesy, of Applied Physics at Stanford University. Brongersma has worked in the fields of nanophotonics and plasmonics, having coined the terms "plasmonics" and "Mie-tronics", and has made contributions to the development of optical metasurfaces and atomically thin optics.

== Early life and education ==
Brongersma was born in Geldrop, Netherlands in 1969. He earned his Ph.D. in materials science in 1998 from Utrecht University's FOM Institute AMOLF in Amsterdam, where he conducted research on light–matter interactions at the nanoscale. He then pursued postdoctoral studies at the California Institute of Technology from 1998 to 2001, being supervised by Harry Atwater.

== Career ==
At Stanford, Brongersma leads a research group exploring new ways to manipulate light using nanoscale structures. His group focuses on metasurfaces, plasmonic devices, and atomically thin optical materials for sensing, imaging, and energy applications. He also serves as a faculty co-director of the Stanford Photonics Research Center (SPRC).

His research demonstrated that metasurfaces can serve as scalable building blocks for optical systems, including transparent sensors and high-resolution imaging technologies.

== Research contributions ==
- Plasmonics and Mie-tronics: Brongersma coined the term "Mie-tronics" to describe optical phenomena in high-index dielectric nanostructures, expanding the field of plasmonics.
- Optical Metasurfaces: His team developed metasurface-based lenses and sensors for compact, efficient, and tunable optical systems.
- Atomically Thin Optics: He used 2D materials in optical devices, exploiting excitonic effects at the atomic scale.

== Publications and patents ==
Brongersma has authored more than 265 peer-reviewed articles.

== Honors and awards ==
- National Science Foundation CAREER Award
- Walter J. Gores Award for Excellence in Teaching at Stanford University
- Raymond and Beverly Sackler Prize in the Physical Sciences for pioneering work in plasmonics

He is a Fellow of Optica (formerly OSA), the Materials Research Society (MRS), SPIE, and the American Physical Society (APS).

== Industry impact ==
Brongersma co-founded Rolith Inc., a startup focused on nanostructured optical coatings and photonic devices. The company was acquired by Metamaterial Technologies Inc. in 2016.
