= Titia Brongersma =

Dutch poet and writer

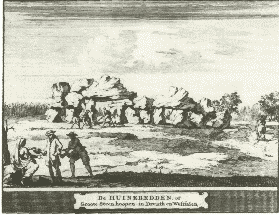
- Born: 1650; Dokkum, Friesland
- Died: 1700 (aged 49–50); Groningen
- Occupation: Poet
- Writing career
- Notable work: "Ode on the hunebed"

Titia Brongersma (Dokkum, Friesland, 1650 – Groningen, 1700) was a Frisian poet of the late 17th century. Her book, De bron-swaan, was published in 1686 and is virtually the only trace of her literary activity. She also gained prominence for excavating a dolmen at Borger, Netherlands in 1685.

Brongersma became widely known for her excavation of the dolmen in Borger in Drenthe. She heard about the dolmen (these are called hunebed in Dutch, plural hunebedden) when she visited Jan Laurens Lenting(h), the schout of Borger, around Pentecost 1685. In July she had one of the hunebedden excavated; to everyone's surprise the dolmen was a grave site, rather than just a heap of rocks created by giants. She wrote a poem on the topic, "Ode on the hunebed".

== Biography ==
Titia Brongersma was the daughter of Bronger Wijtses, surgeon, and Aeltien Koertsdatter. As far as is known, she remained unmarried all her life. She came from a wealthy family with relatives in the upper circles of Leeuwarden, such as Julius Brongersma, a lawyer, and Hillebrandt Brongersma, a mayor.

== Hunebed Research ==
Titia Brongersma also became known for her research into dolmens. The reason was a visit to Jan Laurens Lenting(h), "schulte" of Borger in Drenthe at Pentecost 1685. In June of that year she had a large dolmen excavated in Borger. It was the first (recorded) field investigation of a Dutch dolmen. She found many pebbles laid side by side. Underneath she found many round pots with a brown-blue or dark red color. Some had two and some had four ears. These pots shattered, revealing dead bones and ashes. To her surprise, it turned out to be an old cemetery and not a pile of stones "piled by giants". It inspired her to write her poem Loflied op 't dolmen.

"Praise for the dolmen, or the unusual, stacked pile of stones in Borger in Drenthe
I am astonished to see this rock mite.
It seems that it used to be the brave Hunnic society
They wanted to build a thinking place there
To strive for the top step.
No, it's a pile of giants
Instigated by revenge, he fought against the gods,
But they were even seen to be crushed into mortar
Forged by Mulciber's lightning fire.
Or they are only twisted pyramids,
Or tombs, because this coarse mountain vegetation
Decide in her vault of pre-times
Still, as proof, sanctified sacrificial ashes.
No, it is rather Natura's marble temple,
In which she wants people to honor her deity,
And at the foot of its nine-numbered thresholds
Desire nothing but a song of praise.
Let Thebes still boast of her walls,
Those almost on high reached the clouds,
This rock hazard may last longer.
No force, however great, can hurt her force.
Come, nymphs, and you Drenthe shepherds!
Show off this Borger stone palace with foliage!
Want to cover the top and crown with flowers.
Give to Nature her share and demand thereof.
I then hum in hoarse and hoarse tones
(Let it be what it will) to the glory of the wondrous cave
A song of praise and prepare the oak crowns,
With which I wig the large boulder lock." (In: De Bron-swaan, 1686)

The Groningen physician, antiquary and poet Ludolph Smids reported on her excavation in his Treasury of Dutch Antiquities (1711). In response to this excavation, he wrote a poem about a funeral box.

== Selected works ==
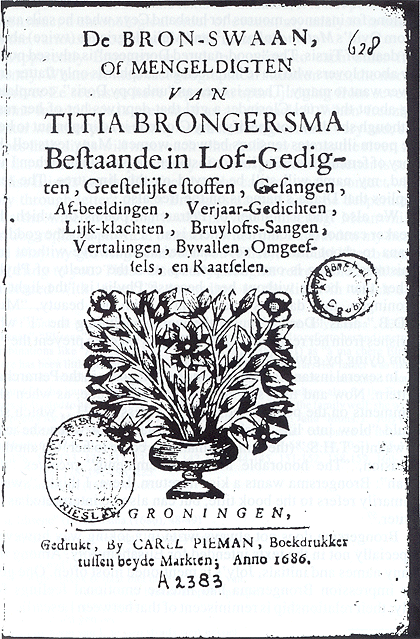
De bron-swaan of mengeldigten van Titia Brongersma, 1686

- De bron-swaan of mengeldigten van Titia Brongersma, 1686
  - Eric Miller, The Swan of the Well by Titia Brongersma. 2020, McGill-Queen’s University Press, Montreal & Kingston, London, Chicago. 538 pp. [bilingual en nl]
- Hemelsche orgeltoonen, ?

== Poetry Collection ==
Brongersma is known for her domestic subjects (embroidery, flower arranging, sculpting) and her love poems to Elise (Elisabeth Joly). She wrote praise poems on, among others, the Frisian poet Adriaan Tymens, the Groningen doctor Ludolph Smids, the Frisian poet Eelkje van Bouricius and the Amsterdam poet Katharyne Lescailje. Her collection also contains four poems in Frisian and several translations by the French poet Pierre de Ronsard.

== See also ==
- 1680s in archaeology
- Timeline of women in science

== Bibliography ==
- Aa (van der), Abraham Jacob. Nieuw biographisch, anthologisch en critisch woordenboek van Nederlandsche dichters. partie I, A-B. W. Amsterdam, De Grebber, 1844, p. 479. (Dutch language)
- Aa (van der), Abraham Jacob. Biographisch woordenboek der Nederlanden: deel 2, derde en vierde stuk, Haarlem, Van Brederode, 1855, p. 1392–1393. (Dutch language)
- Dykstra, Klaes, et Bouke Oldenhof. Lyts hânboek fan de Fryske literatuer, 2e éd., améliorée et élargie, Leeuwarden, Afûk, 1997, p. 27. (West Frisian language)
- Frederiks, Johannes Godefridus, et Frans Jos. van den Branden. Biographisch woordenboek der Noord- en Zuidnederlandsche letterkunde, Amsterdam, Veen, 1888–1891, p. 120–121. (Dutch language)
- Gemert (van), Lia. « Hiding Behind Words? Lesbianism in 17th-Century Dutch Poetry », Thamyris. Mythmaking from past to present 2, 1995, p. 11–44.
- Jensen, Lotte. « Brongersma, Titia », Digitaal Vrouwenlexicon van Nederland, [En ligne], 6 octobre 2009, réf. du 8 août 2014. resources.huygens.knaw.nl (Huygens Instituut voor Nederlandse Geschiedenis). (Dutch language)
- Jeu (de), Annelies. ’t Spoor der dichteressen: netwerken en publicatiemogelijkheden van schrijvende vrouwen in de Republiek (1600-1750), Hilversum, Verloren, 2000, p. 115–131. (Dutch language)
- Klapwijk, Cees (réd.). Titia Brongersma - een noordelijke ster; Dokkum ca. 1650 - ? na 1687, [En ligne], [s. d.], réf. du 8 août 2014. [literatuurgeschiedenis.nl]. (Dutch language)
- Meijer Drees, Marijke, « Het roemrugt'bre jufferdom van Groningen. Over De bron-swaan, of mengeldichten van Titia Brongersma », Klinkend boeket: studies over renaissancesonnetten voor Marijke Spies (différents auteurs), Hilversum, Verloren, 1994, p. 151. (Dutch language)
- L. Jensen en H. Nijboer, Titia Brongersma. Een Friese dichteres in de 17e eeuw, in: Fryslân 4-2 (1998). Zie tevens de biografieën bij de Digitale Bibliotheek voor de Nederlandse Letteren (dbnl).
- Titia Brongersma, in: A.J. van der Aa, Biographisch woordenboek der Nederlanden (deel 2, derde en vierde stuk, 1855).
- De Drentse geschiedenis in meer dan 100 verhalen, Henk Nijkeuter en Paul Brood, ISBN 9789055155446
