= Gabriel Kotliar =

Argentine-American physicist (born 1957)

Gabriel Kotliar (born 1957) is a physicist at Rutgers University in the United States, where he is Board of Governors Professor of Physics.

== Early life ==
Kotliar was born in Argentina. He studied in the Hebrew University of Jerusalem, where he received a B.Sc. degree in Physics and Mathematics in 1979, followed by an M.Sc. in Physics under the tutelage of Daniel Amit in 1980. He then moved to Princeton University, where he received his PhD in Physics in 1983 while working with Prof. Philip Warren Anderson.

== Career ==
His first teaching position was as a postdoctoral associate at the Institute for Theoretical Physics at the University of California Santa Barbara for two years, 1983 to 1985, when he was appointed as an assistant professor at the Massachusetts Institute of Technology. He joined Rutgers University in 1988, still as an associate professor, and was promoted to full professor in 1992. In the autumn of 1990, along with Antoine Georges, he developed dynamical mean field theory.

He has been a visiting professor at the École Normale Supérieure, the École Polytechnique, and the Hebrew University in Jerusalem

== Recognition ==
From 1986 to 1988 he was Alfred P. Sloan Research Fellow and in 1987 received the Young Investigator Award. In 1994 he became a Lady Davis fellow, and nine years later accepted a Guggenheim Fellowship. In 2006 he was awarded the Europhysics Prize. He was named a Fellow of the American Physical Society (APS) in 2000, after a nomination from the APS Division of Condensed Matter Physics, "for development of the dynamical mean field method and its application to strongly correlated electron systems". In 2019 he was elected to the National Academy of Sciences.
