= Laurens W. Molenkamp =

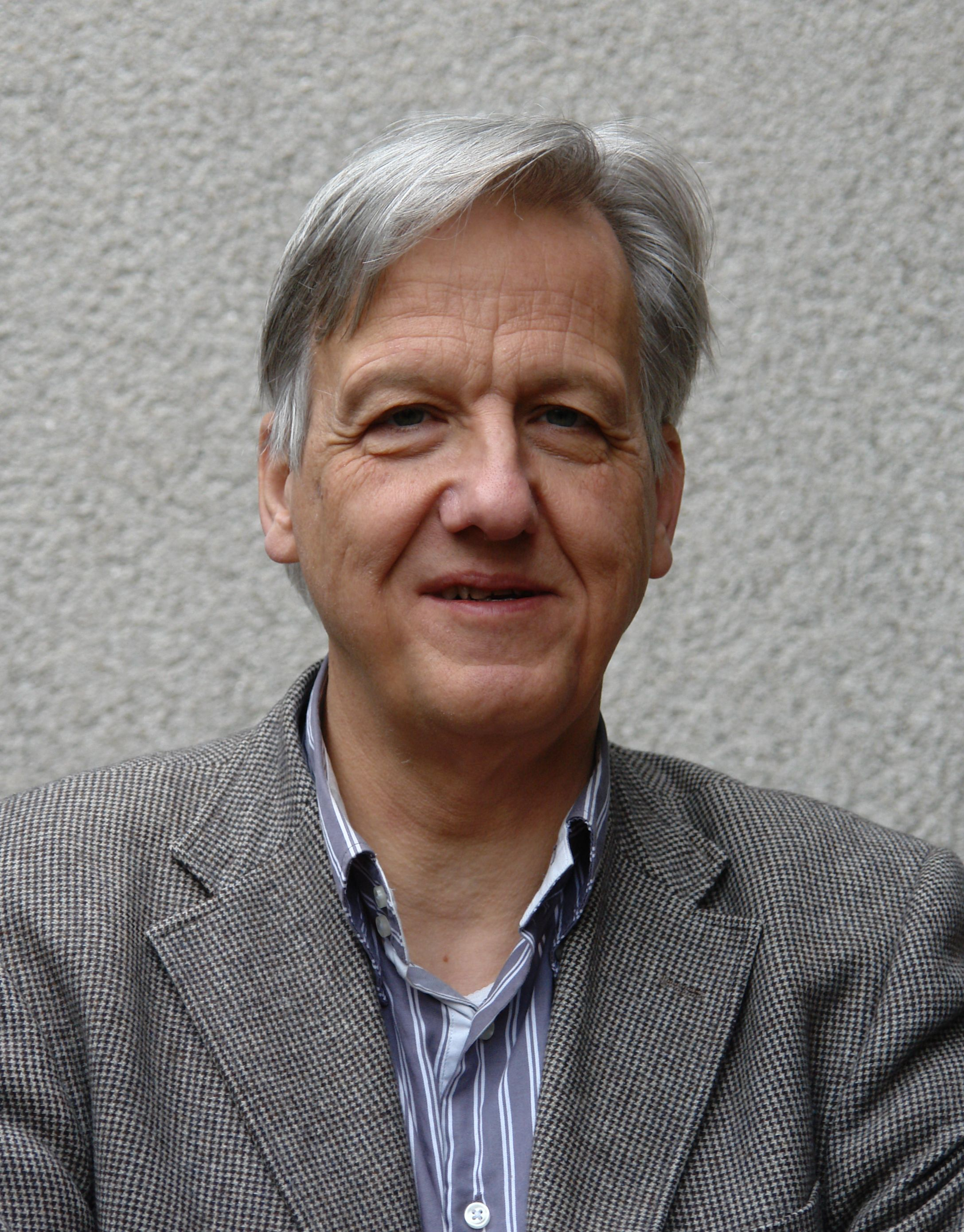
- Laurens W. Molenkamp
- Born: 4 August 1956; Garrelsweer, Netherlands
- Known for: topological insulators
- Awards: 2010 Europhysics Prize; 2012 Oliver E. Buckley Condensed Matter Prize; 2013 Physics Frontiers Prize; 2014 Gottfried Wilhelm Leibniz Prize
- Scientific career
- Fields: condensed matter physics
- Workplaces: University of Würzburg

Laurens W. Molenkamp (born 4 August 1956) is a professor of physics and Chair of Experimental Physics at the University of Würzburg. He is known for his work on semiconductor structures and topological insulators.

== Biography ==
Laurens W. Molenkamp is an experimental condensed matter physicist. He received his Ph.D. in physical chemistry from the University of Groningen, and spent several years first with Philips Research Laboratories in Eindhoven and then as Associate Professor at the RWTH in Aachen. He came to the University of Würzburg in 1999 and is now the Chair of Experimental Physics III and leads the II-VI MBE (molecular beam epitaxy) unit. His research interests include quantum transport in nanostructures, semiconductor spintronics, and optical spectroscopy of semiconductors. He was a co-recipient of the American Physical Society 2012 Oliver E. Buckley Condensed Matter Prize for his experimental observation of the quantum spin Hall effect, opening up the field of topological insulators. Between 2012 and 2023, he has been the Editor of the physics journal Physical Review B.

== Honors ==
- 2009 Fellow, American Physical Society
- 2010 Europhysics Prize
- 2012 Oliver E. Buckley Condensed Matter Prize
- 2013 Physics Frontiers Prize laureate
- 2013 Foreign membership of the Royal Netherlands Academy of Arts and Sciences
- 2014 Gottfried Wilhelm Leibniz Prize
- 2017 Stern-Gerlach Medal
- 2017 King Faisal International Prize
- 2018 Bavarian Maximilian Order for Science and Art
