= Shoucheng Zhang =

Chinese-American physicist (1963–2018)

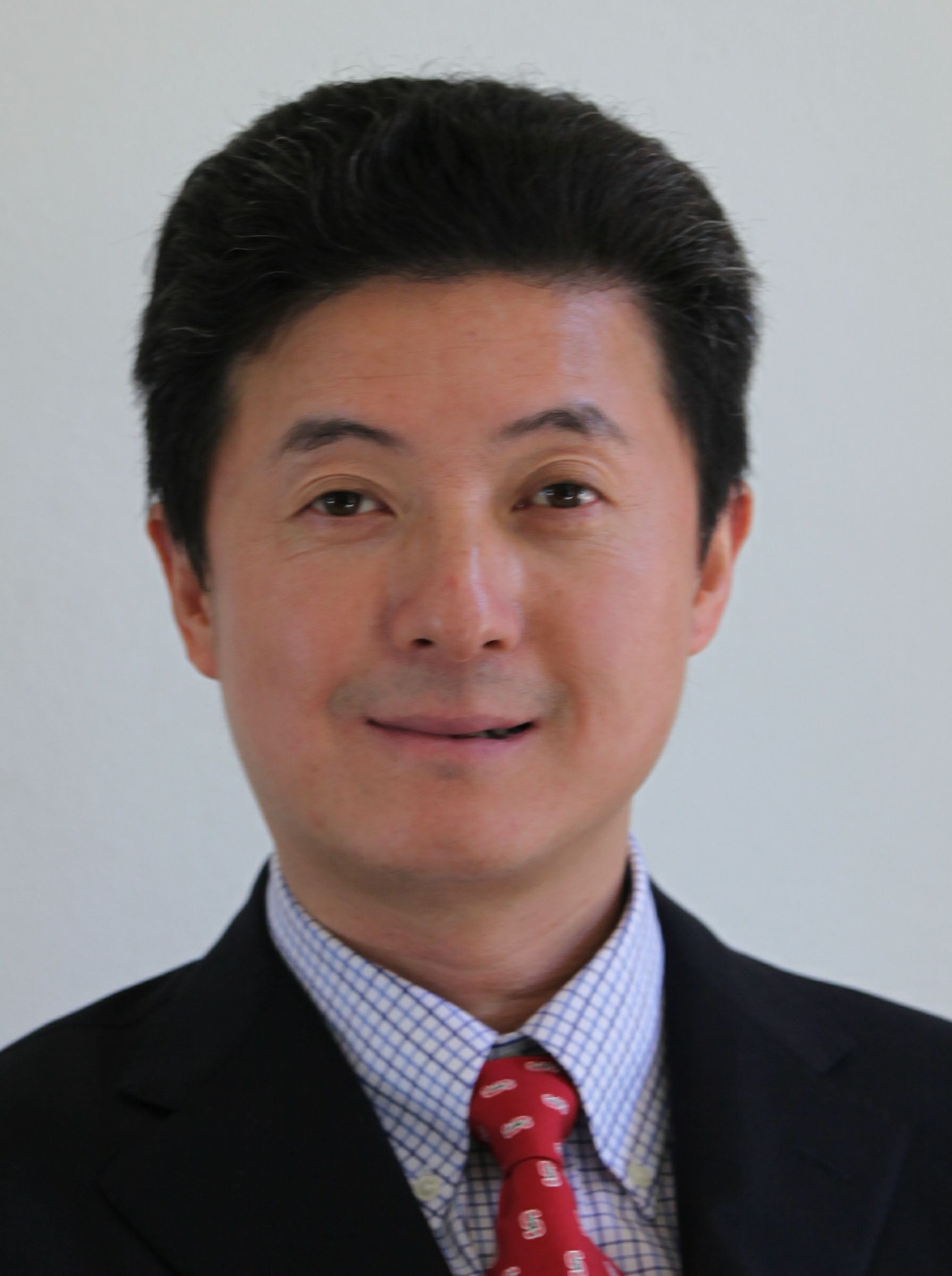
- Born: February 15, 1963; Shanghai, China
- Died: December 1, 2018 (aged 55); San Francisco, California, U.S.
- Education: Fudan University; Freie Universität Berlin; Stony Brook University (PhD)
- Known for: Quantum spin Hall effect; Topological insulators; Field theory of quantum Hall effect; SO(5) theory of high-temperature superconductivity
- Awards: Europhysics Prize (2010); Oliver Buckley Prize (2012); Dirac Medal of the ICTP (2012); Physics Frontiers Prize in Fundamental Physics (2013); Franklin Medal (2015); NAS (2015)
- Scientific career
- Fields: Physics
- Workplaces: Stanford University; Fudan University
- Doctoral advisor: Peter van Nieuwenhuizen
- Other academic advisors: Steven Kivelson; C. N. Yang
- Doctoral students: B. Andrei Bernevig; Eugene Demler
- Other mentees: Xiao-Liang Qi

Shoucheng Zhang (Chinese: 张首晟; February 15, 1963 – December 1, 2018) was a Chinese-American physicist who was the JG Jackson and CJ Wood professor of physics at Stanford University. He was a condensed matter theorist known for his work on topological insulators, the quantum Hall effect, the quantum spin Hall effect, spintronics, and high-temperature superconductivity. According to the National Academy of Sciences:

He discovered a new state of matter called topological insulator in which electrons can conduct along the edge without dissipation, enabling a new generation of electronic devices with much lower power consumption. For this ground breaking work he received numerous international awards, including the Buckley Prize, the Dirac Medal and Prize, the Europhysics Prize, the Physics Frontiers Prize and the Benjamin Franklin Medal.

Zhang founded the venture capital firm Danhua Capital.

== Biography ==
Zhang was born in Shanghai, China in 1963. He was accepted by Fudan University in 1978 at the age of 15, and went abroad in 1980 to study at the Free University of Berlin in West Berlin, where he received his B.S. degree in 1983. He then pursued his graduate studies at Stony Brook University (then referred to as State University of New York, Stony Brook). At Stony Brook, he initially studied supergravity (and earned his Ph.D. in 1987) with his advisor Peter van Nieuwenhuizen, before turning to condensed matter on the advice of his personal hero, Nobel laureate Chen-Ning Yang. In the final year at Stony Brook, he switched to condensed matter physics under the supervision of Steven Kivelson.

Zhang was a postdoctoral Fellow at ITP in Santa Barbara from 1987 to 1989. He then joined IBM Almaden Research Center as a Research Staff Member from 1989 to 1993. Thereafter, he joined Stanford University as assistant professor of physics. Beginning in 2004, he concurrently held (by courtesy appointment) titles of Professor of Applied Physics and Professor of Electrical Engineering at Stanford University. In 2007, the "quantum spin Hall effect" discovered by Zhang was named one of the "Top Ten Important Scientific Breakthroughs in the World" by Science Magazine. In 2010, he was named the J. G. Jackson and C. J. Wood Professor in Physics.

In 2009, Zhang was chosen to be a part of an expert panel for the Thousand Talents Program. In 2013, Zhang created Danhua Capital, a venture capital firm, which raised $434.5 million across two funds. Danhua Capital's major investors include state-owned Beijing government enterprise Zhongguancun Development Group (ZDG), which has been linked to the Chinese technology transfer program Made in China 2025. He also served as an independent non-executive director at Lenovo Group and at Meitu.

Zhang's wife Barbara is a software engineer at IBM. They met in kindergarten, in Shanghai. Together they have two children, a son Brian and a daughter Stephanie.

Zhang died in San Francisco on December 1, 2018, at the age of 55, in an apparent suicide. His family said in a statement that he died "after fighting a battle with depression."

== Scientific achievements ==
Zhang was one of the founders of the field of topological insulators. He made one of the first theoretical proposals of the quantum spin Hall effect. Soon after the initial theoretical proposal, his group theoretically predicted the first realistic quantum spin Hall material in HgTe quantum wells. This prediction was soon confirmed experimentally, launching worldwide research activities. Subsequently, his group predicted numerous novel topological states of matter and topological effects, including the Bi_{2}Se_{3} family of 3D topological insulators, the topological magneto-electric effect, the quantum anomalous Hall effect in magnetic topological insulators, time-reversal invariant topological superconductors, and the realization of a chiral topological superconductor and of chiral Majorana fermions using the quantum anomalous Hall state in proximity with a superconductor. Most of these predicted properties have now been experimentally observed.

Earlier, Zhang also made significant contributions to other areas of physics. He and collaborators derived a topological (Chern–Simons form) quantum field theoretic description of the novel properties of fractional quantum Hall liquids, and proposed a global phase diagram for the quantum Hall states with many features that have had since been experimentally observed. He generalized the theory of fractional quantum Hall effect to higher dimensions and related it to fundamental particle physics. He also proposed an influential theory of high-temperature superconductivity based on an extended symmetry principle.

In early 2000, Zhang and collaborators revitalized the field of spintronics by proposing an intrinsic spin Hall effect and relating it to geometrical phases in quantum mechanics. This proposal stimulated extensive theoretical and experimental work, and also contributed to later developments concerning the quantum spin Hall effect and topological insulators more generally.

Between the years 2010–2015, Zhang and his group of physicists at Stanford University wrote three theoretical papers where they successfully showed how to test Ettore Majorana's theory of Majorana fermion, or what had previously been only a scientific hypothesis that a particle can be its own antiparticle, without the need of external forces having the same mass with the opposite charge of the electron.

== Mentorship and academic legacy ==
Zhang is widely viewed as an outstanding mentor. During his scientific career, he advised and mentored many Ph.D. students, postdocs, and visiting students, many of whom went on to become influential researchers in their fields.

His mentees include Leonid Pryadko (University of California, Riverside), Eugene Demler (ETH Zurich), Yaroslaw Bazaliy (University of South Carolina), Jiangping Hu (Institute of Physics, Chinese Academy of Sciences), B. Andrei Bernevig (Princeton University), Congjun Wu (Westlake University), Taylor L. Hughes (University of Illinois Urbana-Champaign), Joseph Maciejko (University of Alberta), Biao Lian (Princeton University), and Xiao-Qi Sun (Institute of Physics, Chinese Academy of Sciences).

His postdocs include Oskar Vafek (University of Minnesota), Xiao-Liang Qi (Stanford University), Haijun Zhang (Nanjing University), Binghai Yan (Pennsylvania State University), Hong Yao (Tsinghua University), Jing Wang (Fudan University), Yong Xu (Tsinghua University), and Peizhe Tang (Beihang University).

Visiting students include Chao-Xing Liu (Pennsylvania State University) and Zhong Wang (Tsinghua University).

== Honors and awards ==
Zhang was a fellow of the American Physical Society and a fellow of the American Academy of Arts and Sciences. He received the Guggenheim fellowship in 2007, the Alexander von Humboldt Research Prize in 2009, the Europhysics Prize in 2010, the Oliver Buckley Prize in 2012, the Dirac Medal and Prize in 2012, the Physics Frontiers Prize in 2013, the "Nobel-class" Citation Laureates by Thomson Reuters in 2014, and the Benjamin Franklin Medal in 2015. He was identified as one of the top candidates for the Nobel Prize by Thomson Reuters in 2014. He was elected as a member of the US National Academy of Sciences in 2015.

- Fellow, American Physical Society
- Fellow, American Academy of Arts and Sciences
- Guggenheim Fellow, 2007
- Alexander von Humboldt Research Prize, 2009
- Europhysics Prize, 2010
- Oliver Buckley Prize, 2012
- Dirac Medal of the ICTP, 2012
- Physics Frontier Prize, 2013
- "Nobel-class" Citation Laureates by Thomson Reuters, 2014
- Benjamin Franklin Medal, 2015
- Member, National Academy of Sciences (NAS)
- Foreign Member, Chinese Academy of Sciences

== Selected publications ==
- Bernevig, B. Andrei; Hughes, Taylor L.; Zhang, Shou-Cheng (2006). "Quantum spin Hall effect and topological phase transition in HgTe quantum wells". Science. 314 (5806): 1757–1761. arXiv:cond-mat/0611399. Bibcode:2006Sci...314.1757B. doi:10.1126/science.1133734. PMID 17170299. S2CID 7295726.
- König, Markus; Wiedmann, Steffen; Brüne, Christoph; Roth, Andreas; Buhmann, Hartmut; Molenkamp, Laurens W.; Qi, Xiao-Liang; Zhang, Shou-Cheng (November 2, 2007). "Quantum Spin Hall Insulator State in HgTe Quantum Wells". Science. 318 (5851): 766–770. arXiv:0710.0582. Bibcode:2007Sci...318..766K. doi:10.1126/science.1148047. ISSN 0036-8075. PMID 17885096.
- Qi, Xiao-Liang; Hughes, Taylor L.; Zhang, Shou-Cheng (November 2008). "Topological field theory of time-reversal invariant insulators". Physical Review B. 78 (19) 195424. arXiv:0802.3537. Bibcode:2008PhRvB..78s5424Q. doi:10.1103/PhysRevB.78.195424. ISSN 1098-0121.
- Zhang, Haijun; Liu, Chao-Xing; Qi, Xiao-Liang; Dai, Xi; Fang, Zhong; Zhang, Shou-Cheng (June 2009). "Topological insulators in Bi2Se3, Bi2Te3 and Sb2Te3 with a single Dirac cone on the surface". Nature Physics. 5 (6): 438–442. doi:10.1038/nphys1270. ISSN 1745-2473.
- Qi, Xiao-Liang; Zhang, Shou-Cheng (October 2011). "Topological insulators and superconductors". Reviews of Modern Physics. 83 (4): 1057–1110. arXiv:1008.2026. Bibcode:2011RvMP...83.1057Q. doi:10.1103/RevModPhys.83.1057. ISSN 0034-6861.
