= Ramamoorthy Ramesh =

American materials scientist (born 1960)

- Born: 1960 (age 65–66); Chennai, India
- Citizenship: American
- Education: University of California, Berkeley
- Known for: Ferroelectric thin film physics Multiferroic materials Colossal Magnetoresistance; Materials Physics for Energy Efficient Computing
- Awards: APS Adler Lectureship (2005); MRS David Turnbull Award (2007); APS James McGroddy New Materials Prize (2010); TMS Bardeen Prize (2014); IUPAP Magnetism Prize and Neel Medal (2018); ASME Thurston Award Lecture (2018); Europhysics Condensed Matter Prize (2022)
- Scientific career
- Fields: Condensed Matter Physics & Materials Science
- Workplaces: Lawrence Berkeley National Laboratory; Bell Communications Research; University of Maryland, College Park; University of California, Berkeley; Rice University; University of California, Berkeley
- Doctoral students: over 60 PhD students & over 70 postdoctoral scholars

Ramamoorthy Ramesh (born 1960) is an American condensed matter physicist & materials scientist of Indian descent, who co-founded the modern version of the field of Multiferroics. He uses atomically precise synthesis to address the materials physics of complex functional oxides involving the charge-spin-lattice degrees of freedom. More broadly, he has worked on the fundamental science and technology translation of ferroelectrics, manganites with colossal magnetoresistance, and multiferroics with potential benefits for modern information technologies. To date, Ramesh has >700 publications with >150,000 citations, resulting in an h-index >150. He was named Citation Laureate (Thomson Reuters) for his research on multiferroics (2014). His work on the prototypical Multiferroic, BiFeO3, has laid the foundations for both the fundamental materials physics of multiferroics as well as the translation of such unique spin-charge coupling in solids to future energy efficient computing.

He was on leave from Berkeley in 2022, serving as the Executive Vice President for Research at Rice University, where he was also a professor in the Department of Materials Science and Nanoengineering and the Department of Physics and Astronomy. He has since returned to Berkeley as a Professor in the Department of Physics and Department of Materials Science and Engineering.

== Training and career ==
Ramamoorthy Ramesh received a B.S. in Chemistry from Madras University (1980) and a B.E. in Metallurgy from the Indian Institute of Science, Bangalore and his M.S. and Ph.D. in Materials Science and Engineering in 1985 and 1987, respectively. From 1989-1995 Ramesh was a Member of Technical Staff, Bell Communications Research (Red Bank). From 1995-1999, he became an Associate Professor in Materials Science and Engineering, University of Maryland and from 1999-2003 he was a Professor and Distinguished University Professor in Materials Science and Engineering, University of Maryland. Since 2004, he has been a Professor of Physics and Materials Science and Engineering at the University of California, Berkeley. Since his move to Berkeley, Ramesh has had a number of leadership positions including serving as the Founding Director, U.S. Department of Energy SunShot Initiative (2011-2012), the Deputy Director, Science and Technology, Oak Ridge National Laboratory (2013-2014), and the Associate Laboratory Director, Lawrence Berkeley National Laboratory (2014-2018). From 2004 onwards, he is the Purnendu Chatterjee Chair Professor in the Departments of Physics & Materials Science and Engineering at the University of California, Berkeley.

== Awards and honors ==
- 2001 Fellow, American Physical Society
- 2005 American Physical Society Adler Lectureship
- 2007 Materials Research Society David Turnbull Lectureship
- 2009 Materials Research Society Fellow
- 2010 James C. McGroddy Prize for New Materials of the American Physical Society (together with Nicola A. Spaldin and Sang-Wook Cheong)
- 2011 Elected member, United States National Academy of Engineering
- 2012 Distinguished Alumnus Award, Indian Institute of Science Alumni Association
- 2014 FMD John Bardeen Award of TMS
- 2018 IUPAP Magnetism Prize and Néel Medal
- 2020 Elected Foreign Member of the Royal Society.
- 2021 Elected Fellow of the Indian National Science Academy,
- 2022 Europhysics Prize in Condensed Matter Physics
- 2022 Elected Member American Academy of Arts and Sciences
- 2022 Elected Fellow, Indian National Academy of Engineering
- 2022 Fellow, National Academy of Inventors
- 2024 Elected Member, U.S. National Academy of Sciences
- 2024 Elected Member (Foreign), Indian Academy of Sciences
- 2024 ASME Thurston Lecture Award
