= Topological superconductor =

Superconductor that depends on atomic structure

In condensed matter physics and materials chemistry, a topological superconductor is a material that conducts electricity with zero electrical resistivity, and has non-trivial topology which gives it certain unique properties. These materials behave as superconductors that feature exotic edge states, known as Majorana zero modes.

== Classification and examples ==
Topological superconductors are characterized by the topological order related to their electronic band structure. These materials can be classified using the periodic table of topological superconductors, which categorizes topological phases based on time-reversal symmetry, particle-hole symmetry, and chiral symmetry.

An example of a simple topological superconductor in one-dimension is the Kitaev chain.

== Experimental evidence ==
In 2015, uranium ditelluride (UTe_{2}) was found to be a candidate topological superconductor.

== Applications ==
A notable application of topological superconductors is in the realm of topological quantum computing, where Majorana zero modes can be used to implement fault-tolerant quantum gates via braiding operations. This approach leverages the non-Abelian statistics of Majorana modes to perform computations that are protected from local sources of decoherence.

== See also ==
- Topological insulator
- Majorana fermion
- Kitaev chain
- Topological quantum computer
- Cooper pair
