= Peter Armitage =

Peter Armitage may refer to:

- Peter Armitage (statistician) (1924–2024), British statistician
- Peter Armitage (actor) (1939–2018), English actor
- N. Peter Armitage (born 1971), American physicist
