= Park Yung-woo =

South Korean physicist (born 1952)

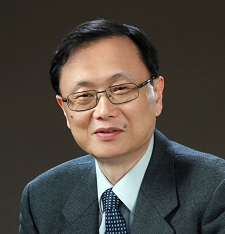
- Park Yung-woo
- Born: 1952 (age 73–74); South Korea
- Education: University of Pennsylvania (Ph.D.); Seoul National University (B.S.)
- Known for: Synthesis and transport in conducting polymers, carbon nanotubes, organic crystals and highly-correlated materials
- Awards: Korean Science Prize in Physics by the Korea Science and Engineering Foundation (Korea President Award)(1991); Research Award from The brothers Jacob and Marcus Wallenberg memorial foundation administered by the Royal Swedish Academy of Science, KVA(2008); Fellow of the American Physical Society (Division of Condensed Matter Physics)(2009); The Korean Physical Society Academic Award (2010)
- Scientific career
- Fields: Physics
- Workplaces: Seoul National University
- Doctoral advisor: Alan J. Heeger

- Park Yung-woo
- Hangul: 박영우
- RR: Bak Yeongu
- MR: Pak Yŏngu

Park Yung-woo (Korean: 박영우, born 1952) is a South Korean physicist, who has worked in the field of materials science.

== Education ==
Park graduated summa cum laude in 1975 from the Physics Department of Seoul National University in South Korea. He received his Ph.D. from University of Pennsylvania, Philadelphia, United States in 1980. Park's Ph.D. thesis on the "Electrical Transport Studies of Pure and Doped Polyacetylene" was supervised by Professor Alan J. Heeger.

== Work ==
Park was involved in the original discovery of conducting polymers in 1977 under the guidance of Prof. Alan J. Heeger at the University of Pennsylvania. For this achievement, Prof. Heeger received the Nobel Chemistry Prize in 2000 together with Prof. Alan G. MacDiarmid and Prof. Hideki Shirakawa.

Park, as a Ph.D. student of Prof. Heeger at the time, had measured the electrical conductivity of iodine doped polyacetylene film and found a conductivity increment of 10 million times. He has continued to study the transport properties of newly doped conducting polymer films, as an assistant professor in Seoul National University since September 1980, after he finished his postdoctoral program in the US, from February to August 1980.

He became a full professor at Seoul National University in 1991. ark spent his sabbatical leaves in the University of California at Santa Barbara (1984–1985), the National High Magnetic Field Laboratory of Florida State University in Tallahassee, Florida, USA (1998), the Max Planck Institute of Solid State Physics in Stuttgart, Germany (2004, 2008 three months each) and Gothenburg/Chalmers University in Sweden (2004, 2008 three months each).

He was the Vice President of the Korean Physical Society as Editor-in-chief of the journal Current Applied Physics. He became a member of the Korean Academy of Science and Technology (KAST) in 1999 and received a lifelong membership in 2001. He was a Director for Foreign Affairs of the KAST (2001–2003). He has served as the Director General for Foreign Affairs of the KAST since March 2011. Also, he has been one of the Foreign Members of the Göteborg Royal Academy of Sciences and Arts in Sweden since December, 2004. He has been a member of the Scientific Advisory Board (SAB) of the Fibron Technology, Inc., USA since November, 2009.

== Awards ==
- The Korean Physical Society Academic Award (2010)
- Fellow of the American Physical Society (Division of Condensed Matter Physics) (2009)
- Research Award from The brothers Jacob and Marcus Wallenberg memory foundation administered by the Royal Swedish Academy of Science, KVA (2008)
- Research Award from the College of Natural Sciences, Seoul National University (2007)
- Best 50 papers selection in 2007 by the Korea Science and Engineering Foundation
- "Grand Prize for the Nano Research Innovation" (2004) given by the Minister of the Ministry of Science and Technology (MOST), Korea.
- Korea Science Award in Physics in 1991 by the Korea Science and Engineering Foundation (President of Korea prize)
- 1991 Korea Science Award

== Technical reports ==
Park has made unique contributions on the synthesis and transport studies of carbon based nanostructures such as conducting polymers, carbon nanotube, organic conductors, molecular conductors and graphene. He has also contributed significantly to the transport and mechanism studies of highly correlated materials, such as high Tc superconductors. In particular, his recent discovery of "Zero magneto resistance in polymer nanofibers" is his most important and seminal achievement.

There has been no such material reported in the history of material sciences in the world. Due to the quenching of orbital motion in the reduced dimension, i.e. the quasi-one-dimensional nature of polymer nanofibers, the intrinsic spin of charge carriers responds to the external field. For this reason, one could probe both spin and charge of the charge carriers (not being dominated by the orbital motion) in the polymer nanofibers by measuring the magneto resistance (MR). The MR vanishes at high electric field remaining zero all the way from H = 0 to 35 tesla in polyacetylene nanofibers.

Other conducting polymers such as polyaniline nanofibers and polythiophene nanofibers do not show the zero MR. Instead, they show positive MR which increases more than 50% as the magnetic field increases to 35 tesla. The zero magneto resistance in polyacetylene nanofibers is understood to be caused from the spinless charge carriers tunneling in high electric field in the quasi-one-dimensional nanofibers.

There would be tremendous applicability of the zero MR characteristics of polymer nanofibers. For example, the high speed magnetic levitation train can be stabilized by using the zero MR switching device made of polymer nanofibers.

There were also other investigated items: the electrospun CNT filled polymer composites and coaxial carbon nanofibers with NiO core, graphene nanorings, perchlorate-doped TTF-diamide nanofibers with double and triple helix structures, CNT based nonvolatile electromechanical memory. In particular, the CNT based nonvolatile MEMS memory [7] has achieved a 1000 times faster switching speed, applicable to the MP3s, smart phones and cameras with very low power consumption and possible multinary bit devices.
