= Alan J. Heeger =

American physicist and chemist (born 1936)

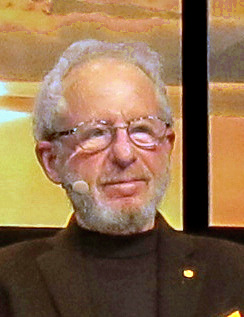
- Heeger in 2013
- Born: Alan Jay Heeger; January 22, 1936 (age 90); Sioux City, Iowa, United States
- Education: University of Nebraska; University of California, Berkeley
- Known for: SSH model
- Spouse: Ruth (2 children)
- Awards: Nobel Prize in Chemistry (2000); Balzan Prize; ENI award Oliver E. Buckley Condensed Matter Prize (1983)
- Scientific career
- Fields: Physics, Chemistry
- Workplaces: University of Pennsylvania; University of California, Santa Barbara
- Thesis: Studies on the magnetic properties of canted antiferromagnets (1962)
- Doctoral advisor: Alan Portis
- Doctoral students: Fan Chunhai (postdoc student), Park Yung-woo

Alan Jay Heeger (born January 22, 1936) is an American physicist, academic and Nobel Prize laureate in chemistry.

Heeger was elected as a member into the National Academy of Engineering in 2002 for co-founding the field of conducting polymers and for pioneering work in making these novel materials available for technological applications.

== Life and career ==
Heeger was born in Sioux City, Iowa, into a Jewish family. He grew up in Akron, Iowa, where his father owned a general store. At age nine, following his father's death, the family moved back to Sioux City.

Heeger earned a B.S. in physics and mathematics from the University of Nebraska in 1957, and a Ph.D in physics from the University of California, Berkeley in 1961. From 1962 to 1982 he was on the faculty of the University of Pennsylvania. In 1982 he commenced his present appointment as a professor in the Physics Department and the Materials Department at the University of California, Santa Barbara. His research has led to the formation of numerous start-up companies including Uniax, Konarka, and Sirigen, founded in 2003 by Guillermo C. Bazan, Patrick J. Dietzen, Brent S. Gaylord. Alan Heeger was a founder of Uniax, which was acquired by DuPont.

He won the Nobel Prize for Chemistry in 2000 along with Alan G. MacDiarmid and Hideki Shirakawa "for their discovery and development of conductive polymers"; They published their results on polyacetylene a conductive polymer in 1977. This led to the construction of the Su–Schrieffer–Heeger model, a simple model for topological insulators.

He had won the Oliver E. Buckley Prize of the American Physical Society in 1983 and, in 1995, the Balzan Prize for Science of Non-Biological Materials.

His sons are the neuroscientist David Heeger and the immunologist Peter Heeger.

In October 2010, Heeger participated in the USA Science and Engineering Festival's Lunch with a Laureate program where middle and high school students engage in an informal conversation with a Nobel Prize-winning scientist over a brown-bag lunch. Heeger is also a member of the USA Science and Engineering Festival's Advisory Board. Heeger has been a judge of the STAGE International Script Competition three times (2006, 2007, 2010).

"Perhaps the greatest pleasure of being a scientist is to have an abstract idea, then to do an experiment (more often a series of experiments is required) that demonstrates the idea was correct; that is, Nature actually behaves as conceived in the mind of the scientist. This process is the essence of creativity in science. I have been fortunate to have experienced this intense pleasure many times in my life." Alan J Heeger, Never Lose Your Nerve!

== Publication list ==
Journal Articles:

- Heeger, Alan (1977). "One-Dimensional Phonons and "Phase-Ordering" Phase Transition in Hg3-deltaAsF6". Physical Review Letters. 39 (23): 1484–1487. Bibcode:1977PhRvL..39.1484H. doi:10.1103/PhysRevLett.39.1484.
- Heeger, Alan (1977). "Electrical Conductivity in Doped Polyacetylene". Physical Review Letters. 39 (17): 1098–1101. Bibcode:1977PhRvL..39.1098C. doi:10.1103/PhysRevLett.39.1098.

Technical Reports:

- Heeger, A. J. and A. G. MacDiarmid. "Polyacetylene, (CH)_{x}, as an Emerging Material for Solar Cell Applications. Final Technical Report, March 19, 1979 – March 18, 1980," University of Pennsylvania, United States Department of Energy, (June 5, 1980).
- Heeger, A. J., Sinclair, M., et al. "Subgap Absorption in Conjugated Polymers," Sandia National Laboratory, United States Department of Energy, (1991).
- Heeger, A. J., Sinclair, M., et al. "Measurements of Photo-induced Changes in Conjugated Polymers," Sandia National Laboratory, United States Department of Energy, (1991).

== Autobiography ==
Heeger, Alan J (2015). Never Lose Your Nerve!. doi:10.1142/9724. ISBN 978-981-4704-85-4., World Scientific Publishing, ISBN 978-981-4704-85-4

== See also ==
- List of Nobel laureates affiliated with the University of California, Santa Barbara
- List of Jewish Nobel laureates
