= Joshua Zak =

Israeli theoretical physicist (1929–2024)

- יהושע זק
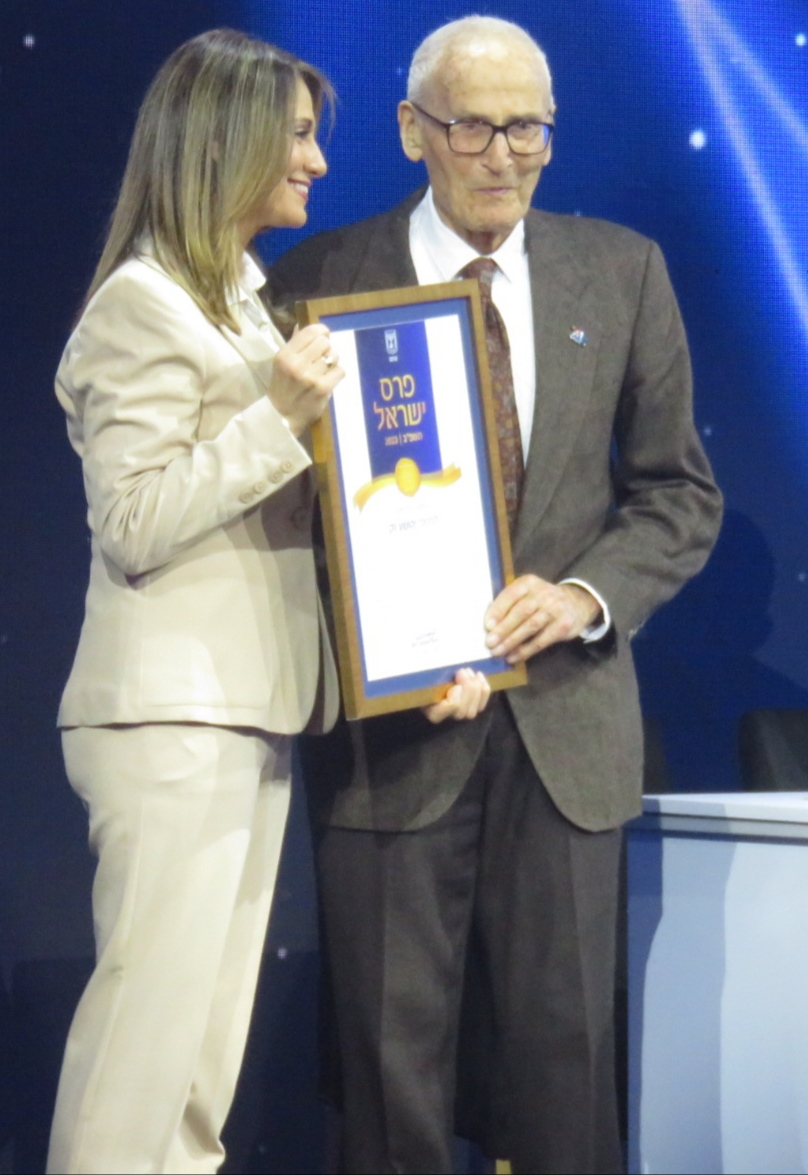
- Zak receiving the Israel Prize from Israeli Minister of Education Yifat Shasha-Biton in 2022
- Born: 26 September 1929; Wilno, Poland (now Vilnius, Lithuania)
- Died: 14 March 2024 (aged 94); Haifa, Israel
- Occupation: Theoretical physicist
- Known for: Zak transform
- Children: 2
- Awards: Wigner medal (2014); Israel Prize (2022)

Joshua Zak (Hebrew: יהושע זק; 26 September 1929 – 14 March 2024) was an Israeli theoretical physicist and writer known for the Zak transform, Zak phase and the Magnetic Translation Group. He received the 2022 Israel Prize and 2014 Wigner medal.

== Honors and awards ==
- Wigner Medal (2014)
- Israel Prize, for his achievements in physics (2022)
- The Brown–Zak fermion and the Zak transform are named after him.

== Selected publications ==
- Zak J. Berry's phase for energy bands in solids. Physical Review Letters. 1989 Jun 5;62(23):2747.
- J. Zak. Magnetic translation group. Physical Review. 1964 Jun 15;134(6A):A1602.
- Zak J, Moog ER, Liu C, Bader SD. A universal approach to magneto-optics. Journal of Magnetism and Magnetic Materials. 1990 Sep 1;89(1–2):107–23
- Zak J, Moog ER, Liu C, Bader SD. Magneto-optics of multilayers with arbitrary magnetization directions. Physical Review B. 1991 Mar 15;43(8):6423.
- Zak J. Finite translations in solid-state physics. Physical Review Letters. 1967 Dec 11;19(24):1385.
