= Mercedeh Khajavikhan =

Iranian and American laser scientist

Mercedeh Khajavikhan is a laser scientist and topological photonics researcher. She is a professor of electrical and computer engineering at the University of Southern California.

== Education and career ==
Khajavikhan received a bachelor's degree in 2000 and a master's degree in 2003 in electrical engineering from the Amirkabir University of Technology in Tehran. She continued her graduate study in electrical engineering at the University of Minnesota in the US, receiving her Ph.D. in 2009.

After postdoctoral research at the University of California, San Diego, she became an assistant professor in the University of Central Florida College of Optics & Photonics in 2012. After earning tenure there in 2018, she moved in 2019 to her present position at the University of Southern California, where she also holds a joint appointment in the Physics and Astronomy Department.

== Recognition ==
Khajavikhan was named as a Fellow of Optica in 2021, "for seminal contributions in the fields of non-Hermitian and topological photonics by conceiving and developing new types of optoelectronic technologies". She was named as a Fellow of the American Physical Society (APS) in 2024, after a nomination from the APS Division of Laser Science, "for important contributions in physical optics and device physics, including PT-based lasers, sensors, gyroscopes, and nanolasers".
