= Konarka Technologies =

American solar energy company

Konarka Technologies, Inc.
- Company type: Private
- Industry: Solar energy
- Founded: 2001; 25 years ago
- Headquarters: 42.6471°N 71.3079°W, Lowell, Massachusetts, USA
- Key people: Howard Berke, Executive chairman; Rick Hess, CEO; Daniel E. Geffken, EVP and CFO; Daniel P. McGahn, EVP and CMO
- Products: Photovoltaics
- Number of employees: 70 (2008)

Konarka Technologies, Inc. was a solar energy company based in Lowell, Massachusetts, founded in 2001 as a spin-off from University of Massachusetts Lowell. In late May 2012, the company filed for Chapter 7 bankruptcy protection and laid off its approximately 80-member staff. The company’s operations have ceased and a trustee is tasked with liquidating the company’s assets for the benefit of creditors.

The company was developing two types of organic solar cells: polymer-fullerene solar cells and dye-sensitized solar cells (DSSCs). Konarka cells were lightweight, flexible photovoltaics that could be printed as film or coated onto surfaces.

The company had hoped its manufacturing process, which utilized organic chemistry, would result in higher efficiency at lower cost than traditional crystalline silicon fabricated solar cells. Konarka was also researching infrared light activated photovoltaics which would enable night-time power generation.

The company's co-founders included the Nobel laureate Alan J. Heeger. The company was named after Konark Sun Temple in India.

== Funding ==
As of 2006, Konarka had received $60 million in funding from venture capital firms including 3i, Draper Fisher Jurvetson, New Enterprise Associates, Good Energies and Chevron Technology Ventures. Konarka also received nearly $10 million in combined grants from the Pentagon and European governments, and in 2007 was approved for further funding through the Solar America Initiative, a component of the White House's Advanced Energy Initiative. The company raised a further $45 million in private capital financing in October 2007 in a financing round led by Mackenzie Financial Corporation.

The company also received $1.5 million from a state of Massachusetts alternative energy trust fund in 2003 during Governor Mitt Romney's term and another $5 million during Governor Deval Patrick's term. At the time of its bankruptcy filing in 2012, its funding history was summarized: "Konarka raised more than $170 million in private capital investments and $20 million in government grants, according to its website. Under the Bush administration, Konarka received a $1.6 million Army contract in 2005 and a $3.6 million award from the Department of Energy in 2007. Under the Obama administration, Konarka was one of 183 clean-energy companies that got a total of $2.3 billion in tax credits as part of the 2009 stimulus."

== Bankruptcy and political fallout ==
The bankruptcy filing occurred days after a visit by Republican presidential candidate Romney to Solyndra, another bankrupted solar energy firm which also received over $500 million of funding from the United States government. The fact that Konarka also received a loan in 2003 during Romney's gubernatorial term was noted by Democrats and inserted into the campaign-politics debate.

== Technology ==
=== Dye-sensitized solar cells ===
Konarka in 2002 was granted licensee rights to dye-sensitized solar cell technology from the Swiss Federal Institute of Technology (EPFL).

This solar-cell design included two main components: a special light-sensitive dye that released electrons when exposed to sunlight and titanium dioxide nanoparticles which escorted electrons away from the dyes and to an external electronic circuit, generating electricity

=== Polymer-fullerene solar cells ===
Konarka built photovoltaic products using next generation nanomaterials that were coated on rolls of plastic (Power Plastic). Konarka's nanomaterials absorbed sunlight and indoor light and converted them into electrical energy. These products could be easily integrated as the power generation component for a variety of applications and could be produced and used virtually anywhere. Konarka was one of several companies developing nanotechnology-based solar cells, others include Nanosolar and Nanosys.

These materials, as well as positive and negative electrodes made from metallic inks, could be inexpensively spread over a sheet of plastic using printing and coating machines to make solar cells, using roll-to-roll manufacturing, similar to how newspaper is printed on large rolls of paper. Konarka’s manufacturing process enabled production to scale easily and results in significantly reduced costs over previous generations of solar cells. . Richard Hess, Konarka's president and CEO, said that the company's ability to use existing equipment allowed it to scale up production at one-tenth the cost compared with conventional technologies.

Unlike conventional solar cells, which were packaged in modules made of glass and aluminum and were rigid and heavy, Konarka's solar cells were lightweight and flexible. This made them attractive for portable applications. What was more, they could be designed in a range of colors, which made them easier to incorporate attractively into certain applications. One of the first products to use Konarka's cells was to be briefcases that could recharge laptops. Another company was testing Konarka's solar cells for use in umbrellas for outdoor tables at restaurants. They could also be used in tents and awnings.

Because the solar cells could be made transparent, Konarka was also developing a version of its solar cells that could be laminated to windows to generate electricity and serve as a window tinting.

However, the technology had several drawbacks. The solar cells only lasted a couple of years, unlike the decades that conventional solar cells last and the solar cells were relatively inefficient. Conventional solar cells can easily convert 15 percent of the energy in sunlight into electricity; Konarka's cells only converted up to 8.3%, the highest certified efficiency that the National Renewable Energy Laboratory had recorded for organic photovoltaic cells by that time.

=== Flexible batteries ===
Konarka owned the rights to an organic-based solar-recharging flexible battery technology. However, as of April 2007, Konarka had no plans to produce these commercially itself.

Flexible batteries have thin-solar cells which are held inside a flexible gas barrier to prevent them from degrading when exposed to air. At just two grams in weight and just one millimetre thick, the flexible battery is small enough to be used in low-wattage gadgets - including flat smart cards and mobile phones. The potential for this type of product was seen as large, given that there was a growing demand for portable self-rechargeable power supplies.

== Production ==
=== Dye-sensitized solar cells ===
Konarka Technologies and Renewable Capital announced the licensing and joint development of Konarka's dye-sensitized solar cell technology for large-scale production, scaling to several hundred megawatts.

=== Polymer-fullerene solar cells ===
Konarka opened a commercial-scale factory, with the capacity to produce enough polymer-fullerene solar cells every year to generate one gigawatt of electricity, the equivalent of a large nuclear reactor. The company planned to gradually ramp up production at its new factory, reaching full capacity in two to three years.

== Patents ==
Konarka was issued a number of United States patents relating to its photovoltaics research:

- 6706963, Jan 25, 2002, "Photovoltaic cell interconnection"
- 6858158, Jan 24, 2003, "Low temperature interconnection of nanoparticles"
- 6900382, Jan 24, 2003, "Gel electrolytes for dye sensitized solar cells"
- 6913713, Jan 24, 2003, "Photovoltaic fibers"
- 6924427, Jan 24, 2003, "Wire interconnects for fabricating interconnected photovoltaic cells
- 6933436, Apr 27, 2001, "Photovoltaic cell"
- 6949400, Jan 24, 2003, "Ultrasonic slitting of photovoltaic cells and modules"
- 7022910, Mar 24, 2003, "Photovoltaic cells utilizing mesh electrodes"
- 7071139, Dec 20, 2002, "Oxynitride compounds, methods of preparation, and uses thereof"
- 7186911, Jan 24, 2003, "Methods of scoring for fabricating interconnected photovoltaic cells"

== See also ==
- Fullerene
- Low cost solar cell
- Oerlikon Solar
- Organic electronics
