= Su–Schrieffer–Heeger model =

Simple model of topological insulator

Trans-polyacetylene

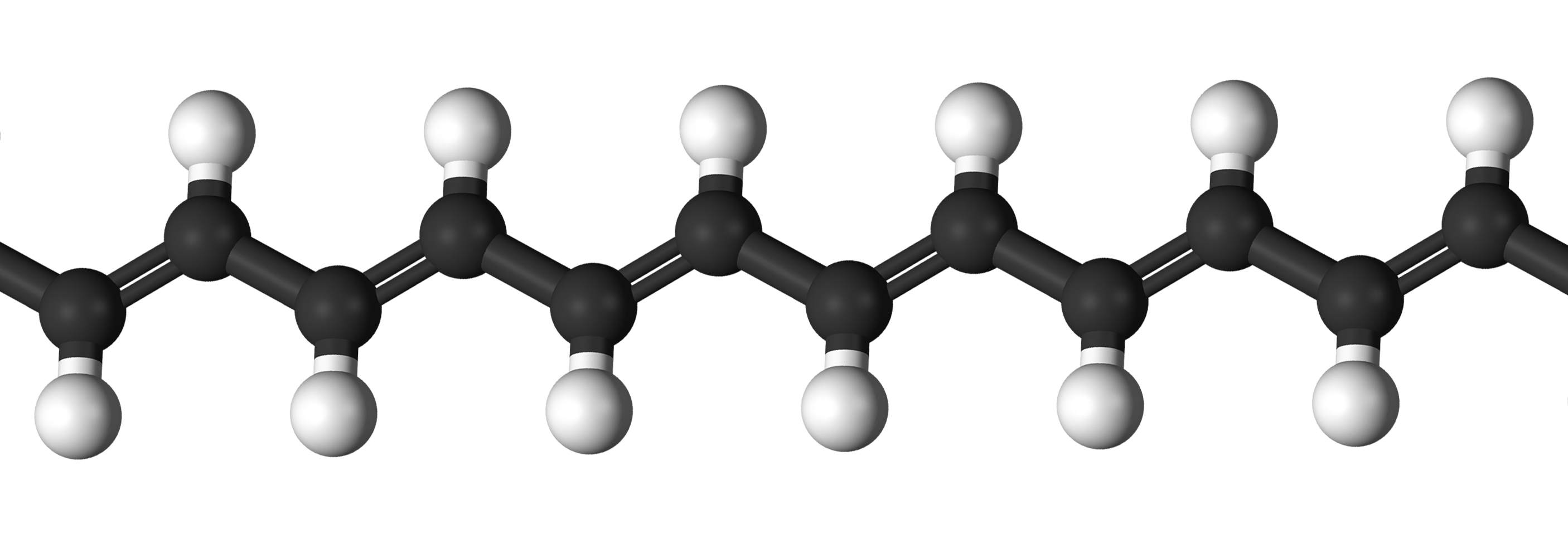
Ball-and-stick model

Structural diagram of polyacetylene.
Note that each carbon atom is connected to two kinds of bonds. The SSH chain was originally used to model the dimerization of this molecule.

In condensed matter physics, the Su–Schrieffer–Heeger (SSH) model or SSH chain is a one-dimensional lattice model that presents topological features. It was devised by Wu-Pei Su, John Robert Schrieffer, and Alan J. Heeger in 1979, to describe the increase of electrical conductivity of polyacetylene polymer chain when doped, based on the existence of solitonic defects. It is a quantum mechanical tight binding approach, that describes the hopping of spinless electrons in a chain with two alternating types of bonds. Electrons in a given site can only hop to adjacent sites.

Depending on the ratio between the hopping energies of the two possible bonds, the system can be either in metallic phase (conductive) or in an insulating phase. The finite SSH chain can behave as a topological insulator, depending on the boundary conditions at the edges of the chain. For the finite chain, there exists an insulating phase that is topologically non-trivial and allows for the existence of edge states that are localized at the boundaries.

== Description ==
The model describes a half-filled one-dimensional lattice, with two sites per unit cell, A and B, which correspond to a single electron per unit cell. In this configuration each electron can either hop inside the unit cell or hop to an adjacent cell through nearest neighbor sites. As with any 1D model, with two sites per cell, there will be two bands in the dispersion relation (usually called optical and acoustic bands). If the bands do not touch, there is a band gap. If the gap lies at the Fermi level, then the system is considered to be an insulator.

The tight binding Hamiltonian in a chain with N sites can be written as

$$H=v\sum_{n=1}^{N}|n,B\rangle\langle n,A|+w\sum_{n=1}^{N}|n+1,A\rangle\langle n,B|+\mathrm{h.c.}$$

where h.c. denotes the Hermitian conjugate, v is the energy required to hop from a site A to B inside the unit cell, and w is the energy required to hop between unit cells. Here the Fermi energy is fixed to zero.

=== Bulk solution ===
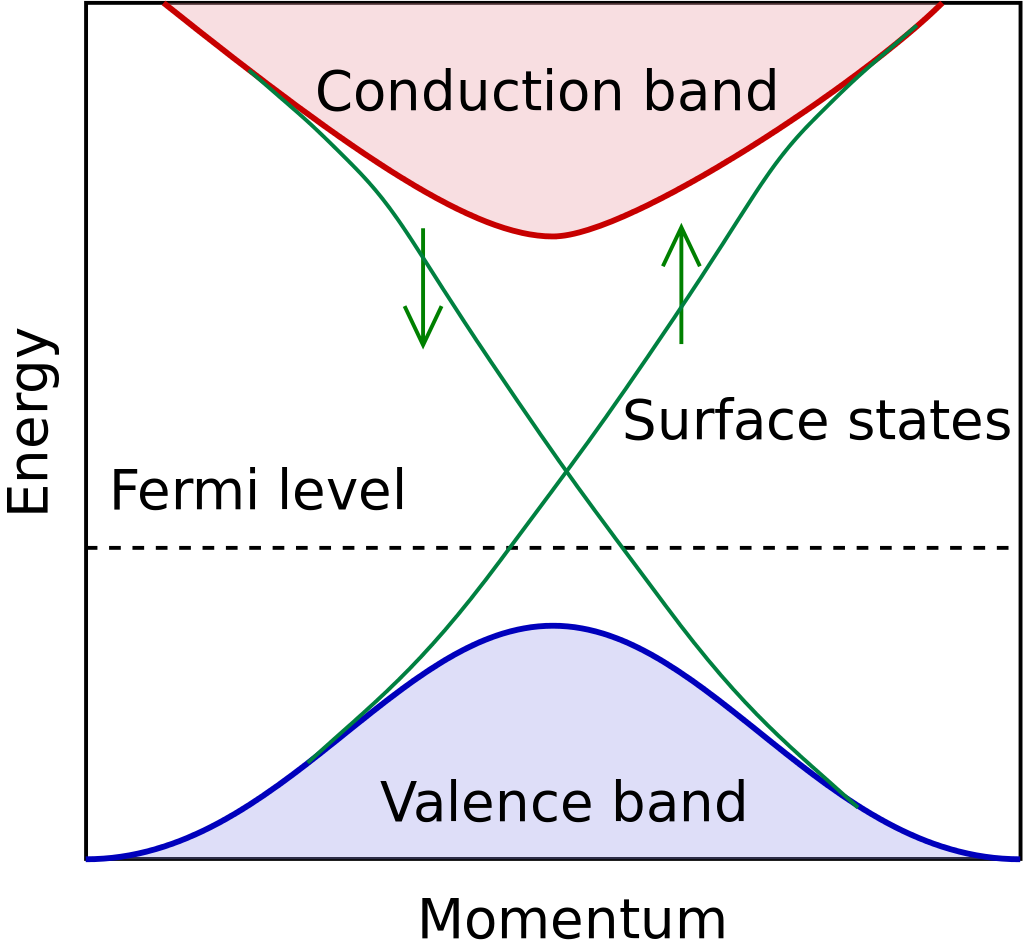
A sketch of the band structure for a topological insulator (like in the bulk SSH chain). The Fermi level falls within the bulk band gap.

The dispersion relation for the bulk can be obtained through a Fourier transform. Taking periodic boundary conditions $|N+1,X\rangle=|1,X\rangle$, where $X=A,B$, we pass to k-space by doing

$$|n,X\rangle=\frac{1}{\sqrt{N}}\sum_{k}e^{ikn}|k,X\rangle$$,

which results in the following Hamiltonian

$$H=\sum_k (v + e^{ik}w )|k,A\rangle\langle k,B| +\text{h.c.}=\sum_k H(k)|k\rangle\langle k|,$$
$$H(k)=\begin{pmatrix}0 & v+e^{ik}w \\ v+e^{-ik}w & 0\end{pmatrix}$$

where the eigenenergies are easily calculated as

$$E_{v w}=\pm\sqrt{v^2+w^2+2vw\cos k},$$

and the corresponding eigenstates are

$$|k,\pm\rangle=\frac{1}{\sqrt{2}}\left(\pm e^{i\phi_k}|k,A\rangle + |k,B\rangle\right),$$

where

$$\tan\phi_k=\frac{w\sin k}{v+w\cos k}.$$

The eigenenergies are symmetrical under swap of $v\leftrightarrow w$, and the dispersion relation is mostly gapped (insulator) except when $v=w$ (metal). By analyzing the energies, the problem is apparently symmetric about $v=w$, the $v>w$ has the same dispersion as $v<w$. Nevertheless, not all properties of the system are symmetrical, for example the eigenvectors are very different under swap of $v\leftrightarrow w$. It can be shown for example that the Berry connection

$$A_-(k)=i\left\langle k,-\left|\frac{\mathrm{d}}{\mathrm{d}k}\right|k,-\right\rangle=-\frac{1}{2}\frac{\mathrm{d}\phi_k}{\mathrm{d}k},$$

integrated over the Brillouin zone $k\in\{-\pi,\pi\}$, produces different winding numbers:

$$g=-\frac{1}{\pi}\int_{\rm BZ}A_-(k)\mathrm{d}k=\left\{\begin{matrix} 0 & v>w\\ \text{undefined} & v=w \\ 1 & v<w\end{matrix}\right.,$$

showing that the two insulating phases, $v>w$ and $v<w$, are topologically different (small changes in v and w change $A_-(k)$ but not $g$ over the Brillouin zone). The winding number remains undefined for the metallic case $v=w$. This difference in topology means that one cannot pass from an insulating phase to another without closing the gap (passing by the metallic phase). This phenomenon is called a topological phase transition.

=== Finite chain solution and edge states ===
The physical consequences of having different winding number become more apparent for a finite chain with an even number of $N$ lattice sites. It is much harder to diagonalize the Hamiltonian analytically in the finite case due to the lack of translational symmetry.

==== Dimerized cases ====
There exist two limiting cases for the finite chain, either $v=0$ or $w=0$. In both of these cases, the chain is clearly an insulator as the chain is broken into dimers (dimerized). However one of the two cases would consist of $N/2$ dimers, while the other case would consist of $(N-2)/2$ dimers and two unpaired sites at the edges of the chain. In the latter case, as there is no on-site energy, if an electron finds itself on any of the two edge sites, its energy would be zero. So either the case $v=0$ or the case $w=0$ would necessarily have two eigenstates with zero energy, while the other case would not have zero-energy eigenstates. Contrary to the bulk case, the two limiting cases are not symmetrical in their spectrum.

==== Intermediate values ====
By plotting the eigenstates of the finite chain as function of position, one can show that there are two distinct kinds of states. For non-zero eigenenergies, the corresponding wavefunctions would be delocalized all along the chain while the zero energy eigenstates would portray localized amplitudes at the edge sites. The latter are called edge states. Even if the eigenenergies lie in the gap, the edge states are localized and correspond to an insulating phase.

By plotting the spectrum as a function of $v$ for a fixed value of $w$, the spectrum is divided into two insulating regions divided by the metallic intersection at $w=v$. The spectrum would be gapped in both insulating regions, but one of the regions would show zero energy eigenstates and the other region would not, corresponding to the dimerized cases. The existence of edge states in one region and not in the other demonstrate the difference between insulating phases and it is this sharp transition at $w=v$ that correspond to a topological phase transition.

=== Correspondence between finite and bulk solutions ===
The bulk case allows to predict which insulating region would present edge states, depending on the value of the winding number in the bulk case. For the region where the winding number is $g=1$ in the bulk, the corresponding finite chain with an even number of sites would present edge states, while for the region where the winding number is $g=0$ in the bulk case, the corresponding finite chain would not. This relation between winding numbers in the bulk and edge states in the finite chain is called the bulk-edge correspondence.

== See also ==
- Kitaev chain
- Peierls transition
- Davydov soliton
