= Zak transform =

Mathematical operation

In mathematics, the Zak transform (also known as the Gelfand mapping) is a certain operation which takes as input a function of one variable and produces as output a function of two variables. The output function is called the Zak transform of the input function. The transform is defined as an infinite series in which each term is a product of a dilation of a translation by an integer of the function and an exponential function. In applications of Zak transform to signal processing the input function represents a signal and the transform will be a mixed time–frequency representation of the signal. The signal may be real valued or complex-valued, defined on a continuous set (for example, the real numbers) or a discrete set (for example, the integers or a finite subset of integers). The Zak transform is a generalization of the discrete Fourier transform.

The Zak transform had been discovered by several people in different fields and was called by different names. It was called the "Gelfand mapping" because Israel Gelfand introduced it in his work on eigenfunction expansions. The transform was rediscovered independently by Joshua Zak in 1967 who called it the "k-q representation". There seems to be a general consensus among experts in the field to call it the Zak transform, since Zak was the first to systematically study that transform in a more general setting and recognize its usefulness.

== Continuous-time Zak transform: Definition ==
In defining the continuous-time Zak transform, the input function is a function of a real variable. So, let f(t) be a function of a real variable t. The continuous-time Zak transform of f(t) is a function of two real variables one of which is t. The other variable may be denoted by w. The continuous-time Zak transform has been defined variously.

=== Definition 1 ===
Let a be a positive constant. The Zak transform of f(t), denoted by Z_{a}[f], is a function of t and w defined by

$$Z_a[f](t,w) = \sqrt{a}\sum_{k=-\infty}^{\infty}f(at + ak)e^{-2\pi kw i}$$.

=== Definition 2 ===
The special case of Definition 1 obtained by taking a = 1 is sometimes taken as the definition of the Zak transform. In this special case, the Zak transform of f(t) is denoted by Z[f].

$$Z[f](t,w) = \sum_{k=-\infty}^{\infty}f(t + k)e^{-2\pi kw i}$$.

=== Definition 3 ===
The notation Z[f] is used to denote another form of the Zak transform. In this form, the Zak transform of f(t) is defined as follows:

$$Z[f](t,\nu) = \sum_{k=-\infty}^{\infty}f(t + k)e^{-k\nu  i}$$.

=== Definition 4 ===
Let T be a positive constant. The Zak transform of f(t), denoted by Z_{T}[f], is a function of t and w defined by

$$Z_T[f](t,w) = \sqrt{T}\sum_{k=-\infty}^{\infty}f(t + kT)e^{-2\pi kwT i}$$.

Here t and w are assumed to satisfy the conditions 0 ≤ t ≤ T and 0 ≤ w ≤ 1/T.

== Example ==
The Zak transform of the function

$$\phi(t)=\begin{cases}1,&0\le t<1 \\ 0, &\text{otherwise}\end{cases}$$

is given by

$$Z[\phi](t,w)=e^{-2\pi \lceil -t\rceil w i}$$

where $\lceil - t\rceil$ denotes the smallest integer not less than $-t$ (the ceiling function).

== Properties of the Zak transform ==
In the following it will be assumed that the Zak transform is as given in Definition 2.

1. Linearity

Let a and b be any real or complex numbers. Then

$$Z[af+bg](t,w)=aZ[f](t,w)+bZ[g](t,w)$$

2. Periodicity

$$Z[f](t, w+1) = Z[f](t,w)$$

3. Quasi-periodicity

$$Z[f](t+1, w)= e^{2\pi w i}Z[f](t,w)$$

4. Conjugation

$$Z[\bar{f}](t,w)=\overline{Z[f]}(t,-w)$$

5. Symmetry

If f(t) is even then $Z[f](t,w)=Z[f](-t,-w)$

If f(t) is odd then $Z[f](t,w)= -Z[f](-t,-w)$

6. Convolution

Let $\star$ denote convolution with respect to the variable t.

$$Z[f\star g](t,w)=Z[f](t,w)\star Z[g](t,w)$$

== Inversion formula ==
Given the Zak transform of a function, the function can be reconstructed using the following formula:

$$f(t)= \int_0^1 Z[f](t,w)\, dw.$$

== Discrete Zak transform: Definition ==
Let $f(n)$ be a function of an integer variable $n \in \mathbb Z$ (a sequence). The discrete Zak transform of $f(n)$ is a function of two real variables, one of which is the integer variable $n$. The other variable is a real variable which may be denoted by $w$. The discrete Zak transform has also been defined variously. However, only one of the definitions is given below.

=== Definition ===
The discrete Zak transform of the function $f(n)$ where $n$ is an integer variable, denoted by $Z[f]$, is defined by

$$Z[f](n,w)=\sum_{k=-\infty}^{\infty} f(n+k)e^{-2\pi k w i}.$$

=== Inversion formula ===
Given the discrete transform of a function $f(n)$, the function can be reconstructed using the following formula:

$$f(n)= \int_0^1 Z[f](n,w)\, dw.$$

== Applications ==
The Zak transform has been successfully used in physics in quantum field theory, in electrical engineering in time-frequency representation of signals, and in digital data transmission. The Zak transform has also applications in mathematics. For example, it has been used in the Gabor representation problem.
