= Fan Chunhai =

Chemistry researcher

- 樊春海
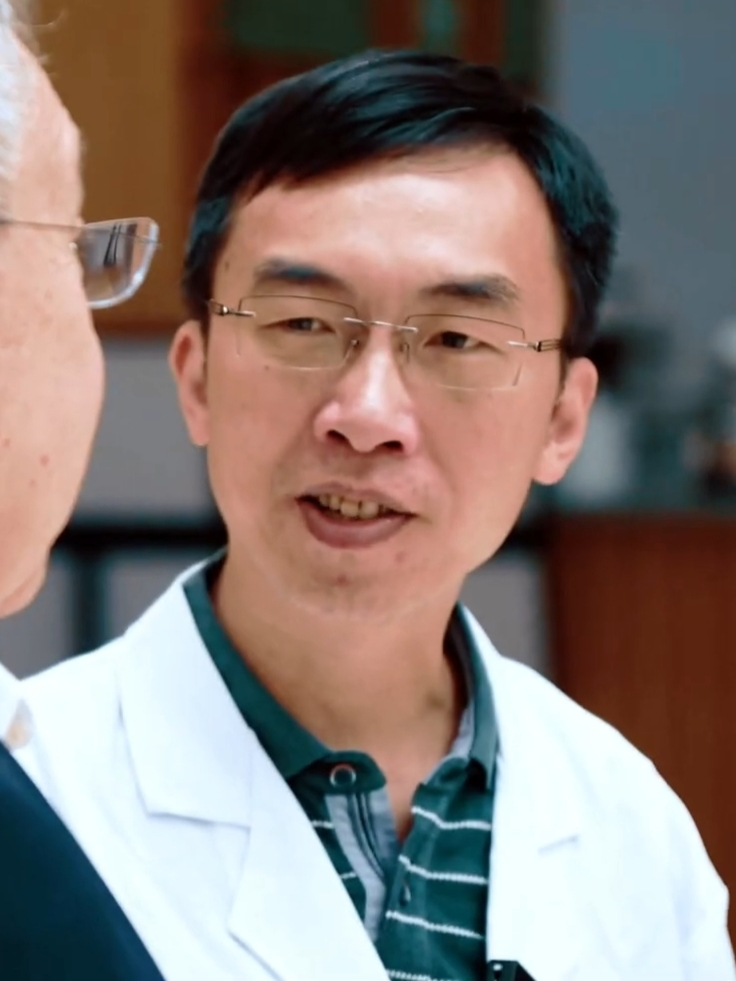
- Fan during a meet with Carlos Bustamante in 2023
- Born: March 1974 (age 52); Zhangjiagang, Jiangsu, China
- Education: Nanjing University; University of California, Santa Barbara
- Scientific career
- Fields: Analytical chemistry Nanotechnology; Biophotonics
- Workplaces: Shanghai Jiao Tong University
- Academic advisors: Zhu Dexu; Chen Hong-Yuan; Li Genxi; Alan J. Heeger

Fan Chunhai (Chinese: 樊春海; pinyin: Fán Chūnhǎi; born March 1974) is a Chinese chemist and Chair Professor at the School of Chemistry and Chemical Engineering, Shanghai Jiaotong University.

== Early life and education ==
Fan was born in Zhangjiagang, Jiangsu province in March 1974. He received his a bachelor's degree and doctor's degree from Nanjing University in 1996 and 2000, respectively. He was a postdoc at the University of California, Santa Barbara under Alan J. Heeger.

== Career ==
He returned to China in July 2000 and that same year became director of the Laboratory of Physical Biology, Shanghai Institute of Applied Physics, Chinese Academy of Sciences (CAS).

In April 2018 he joined the School of Chemistry and Chemical Engineering, Shanghai Jiaotong University as a Chair Professor.

In December 2017 he became a member of the 14th Central Committee of Jiusan Society.

== Honours and awards ==
- Fellow of the American Association for the Advancement of Science (AAAS)
- Fellow of the International Society of Electrochemistry (ISE)
- Fellow of the Royal Society of Chemistry (RSC)
- November 18, 2019 Youth Innovation Award of the Ho Leung Ho Lee Foundation
- November 22, 2019 Member of the Chinese Academy of Sciences (CAS)
- 2019 ACS Advances in Measurement Science Lectureship winners
