= N. Peter Armitage =

American physicist

N. Peter Armitage (born 1971) is an American physicist who is currently a Professor of Physics and Astronomy at The Johns Hopkins University. His research centers on understanding material systems that exhibit coherent quantum effects at low temperatures, like superconductors and quantum magnetism. His principal scientific interest is understanding how it is that large ensembles of strongly interacting, but fundamentally simple particles like electrons in solids act collectively to exhibit complex emergent quantum phenomena. He exploits and develops techniques using low-frequency microwave and THz range radiation that probe these systems at their natural frequency scales. The material systems of interest require new measurement techniques as their relevant frequencies typically fall between the ranges of usual optical and electronic methods.

== Career ==
Armitage received a BS degree from Rutgers University and a PhD from Stanford University in 2002. He did postdoctoral work at the University of California, Los Angeles and the University of Geneva. He joined the faculty of Johns Hopkins in 2006, where he is currently a Professor of Physics and Astronomy. He was a visiting Professor at the Institute for Solid State Physics at the University of Tokyo in 2018-2019.

He is known primarily for his work on superconductivity, magnetism, disordered systems, and topological materials. During his PhD., he did seminal work with angle-resolved photoemission on the electron-doped cuprates. At Johns Hopkins, his group has measured the quantized magnetoelectric "axion" response of topological insulators. This quantized response is the 3D equivalent in topological insulators of the quantized Hall plateaus found in quantum Hall systems. Other work demonstrated the existence of Kramers-Wannier duality in Kitaev chains.

Armitage has been a recipient of a DARPA Young Faculty Award, an NSF Career Award, a Sloan Research Fellowship, was a three time Kavli Frontiers Fellow, the William Spicer Award from the Stanford Synchrotron Radiation Laboratory, the William L. McMillan Award from the University of Illinois, the 2016 Genzel Prize, and was the 2019 Nakamura Lecturer at the UCSB Materials Department. He is a member of the Quantum Materials Program at the Canadian Institute for Advanced Research (CIFAR) and was the co-chair of the 2014 Gordon Research Conference in Correlated Electron Systems.
