= Magnetic topological insulator =

Topological insulators of magnetic materials

In physics, magnetic topological insulators are three dimensional magnetic materials with a non-trivial topological index protected by a symmetry other than time-reversal. This type of material conducts electricity on its outer surface, but its volume behaves like an insulator.

In contrast with a non-magnetic topological insulator, a magnetic topological insulator can have naturally gapped surface states as long as the quantizing symmetry is broken at the surface. These gapped surfaces exhibit a topologically protected half-quantized surface anomalous Hall conductivity ($e^2/2h$) perpendicular to the surface. The sign of the half-quantized surface anomalous Hall conductivity depends on the specific surface termination.

== Theory ==
=== Axion coupling ===
The $\mathbb{Z}_2$ classification of a 3D crystalline topological insulator can be understood in terms of the axion coupling $\theta$. A scalar quantity that is determined from the ground state wavefunction

$$\theta = -\frac{1}{4\pi}\int_{\rm BZ} d^3k \, \epsilon^{\alpha \beta \gamma} \text{Tr} \Big[ \mathcal{A}_\alpha \partial_\beta \mathcal{A}_\gamma -i\frac{2}{3} \mathcal{A}_\alpha \mathcal{A}_\beta \mathcal{A}_\gamma \Big]$$.

where $\mathcal{A}_\alpha$ is a shorthand notation for the Berry connection matrix

$$\mathcal{A}_j^{nm}(\mathbf{k}) = \langle u_{n\mathbf{k}} | i\partial_{k_j} | u_{m\mathbf{k}} \rangle$$,

where $| u_{m\mathbf{k}} \rangle$ is the cell-periodic part of the ground state Bloch wavefunction.

The topological nature of the axion coupling is evident if one considers gauge transformations. In this condensed matter setting a gauge transformation is a unitary transformation between states at the same $\mathbf{k}$ point

$$|\tilde{\psi}_{n\mathbf{k}}\rangle = U_{mn}(\mathbf{k})|\psi_{n\mathbf{k}}\rangle$$.

Now a gauge transformation will cause $\theta \rightarrow \theta +2\pi n$ , $n \in \mathbb{N}$. Since a gauge choice is arbitrary, this property tells us that $\theta$ is only well defined in an interval of length $2\pi$ e.g. $\theta \in [-\pi,\pi]$.

The final ingredient we need to acquire a $\mathbb{Z}_2$ classification based on the axion coupling comes from observing how crystalline symmetries act on $\theta$.

- Fractional lattice translations $\tau_q$, n-fold rotations $C_n$: $\theta \rightarrow \theta$.
- Time-reversal $T$, inversion $I$: $\theta \rightarrow -\theta$.

The consequence is that if time-reversal or inversion are symmetries of the crystal we need to have $\theta = -\theta$ and that can only be true if $\theta = 0$(trivial),$\pi$(non-trivial) (note that $-\pi$ and $\pi$ are identified) giving us a $\mathbb{Z}_2$ classification. Furthermore, we can combine inversion or time-reversal with other symmetries that do not affect $\theta$ to acquire new symmetries that quantize $\theta$. For example, mirror symmetry can always be expressed as $m=I*C_2$ giving rise to crystalline topological insulators, while the first intrinsic magnetic topological insulator MnBi$_2$Te$_4$ has the quantizing symmetry $S=T*\tau_{1/2}$.

=== Surface anomalous hall conductivity ===
So far we have discussed the mathematical properties of the axion coupling. Physically, a non-trivial axion coupling ($\theta = \pi$) will result in a half-quantized surface anomalous Hall conductivity ($\sigma^{\text{surf}}_{\text{AHC}}=e^2/2h$) if the surface states are gapped. To see this, note that in general $\sigma^{\text{surf}}_{\text{AHC}}$ has two contribution. One comes from the axion coupling $\theta$, a quantity that is determined from bulk considerations as we have seen, while the other is the Berry phase $\phi$ of the surface states at the Fermi level and therefore depends on the surface. In summary for a given surface termination the perpendicular component of the surface anomalous Hall conductivity to the surface will be

$$\sigma^{\text{surf}}_{\text{AHC}} = -\frac{e^2}{h}\frac{\theta-\phi}{2\pi} \ \text{mod} \ e^2/h$$.

The expression for $\sigma^{\text{surf}}_{\text{AHC}}$ is defined $\text{mod} \ e^2/h$ because a surface property ($\sigma^{\text{surf}}_{\text{AHC}}$) can be determined from a bulk property ($\theta$) up to a quantum. To see this, consider a block of a material with some initial $\theta$ which we wrap with a 2D quantum anomalous Hall insulator with Chern index $C=1$. As long as we do this without closing the surface gap, we are able to increase $\sigma^{\text{surf}}_{\text{AHC}}$ by $e^2/h$ without altering the bulk, and therefore without altering the axion coupling $\theta$.

One of the most dramatic effects occurs when $\theta=\pi$ and time-reversal symmetry is present, i.e. non-magnetic topological insulator. Since $\boldsymbol{\sigma}^{\text{surf}}_{\text{AHC}}$ is a pseudovector on the surface of the crystal, it must respect the surface symmetries, and $T$ is one of them, but $T\boldsymbol{\sigma}^{\text{surf}}_{\text{AHC}} =- \boldsymbol{\sigma}^{\text{surf}}_{\text{AHC}}$ resulting in $\boldsymbol{\sigma}^{\text{surf}}_{\text{AHC}} = 0$. This forces $\phi = \pi$ on every surface resulting in a Dirac cone (or more generally an odd number of Dirac cones) on every surface and therefore making the boundary of the material conducting.

On the other hand, if time-reversal symmetry is absent, other symmetries can quantize $\theta=\pi$ and but not force $\boldsymbol{\sigma}^{\text{surf}}_{\text{AHC}}$ to vanish. The most extreme case is the case of inversion symmetry (I). Inversion is never a surface symmetry and therefore a non-zero $\boldsymbol{\sigma}^{\text{surf}}_{\text{AHC}}$ is valid. In the case that a surface is gapped, we have $\phi = 0$ which results in a half-quantized surface AHC $\sigma^{\text{surf}}_{\text{AHC}} = -\frac{e^2}{2h}$.

A half quantized surface Hall conductivity and a related treatment is also valid to understand topological insulators in magnetic field giving an effective axion description of the electrodynamics of these materials. This term leads to several interesting predictions including a quantized magnetoelectric effect. Evidence for this effect has recently been given in THz spectroscopy experiments performed at the Johns Hopkins University.

== Experimental realizations ==
Magnetic topological insulators have proven difficult to create experimentally. In 2023, it was estimated that a magnetic topological insulator might be developed in roughly 15 years' time.

A compound composed of manganese, bismuth, and tellurium (MnBi_{2}Te_{4}) emerged as the first intrinsic antiferromagnetic topological insulator (AFM TI), demonstrating the coexistence of magnetic order and topological insulating behaviour.

In 2024, researchers at the University of Chicago utilized advanced spectroscopy techniques—such as time- and angle-resolved photoemission and time-resolved magneto-optical Kerr effect (MOKE)—to study MnBi_{2}Te_{4} dynamics, particularly why the material's predicted topological properties were elusive experimentally. These efforts are part of a broader initiative to realize practical applications based on MnBi_{2}Te_{4}.

Significantly, the material's magnetic behavior was found to change rapidly when exposed to light, pointing toward a novel route for optical data storage. Laser pulses can manipulate MnBi_{2}Te_{4}'s magnetic states, potentially enabling an optical memory device that operates faster and more energy-efficiently than conventional electronic memory, with promising implications for quantum computing.

In 2024, Josephson coupling was demonstrated in superconducting junctions fabricated on MnBi_{2}Te_{4} flakes. These devices showed supercurrent flow and SQUID-like interference patterns, hinting at superconductivity mediated via magnetic topological edge states—an important step toward realizing topological superconductivity and related quantum phenomena such as Majorana modes.
