= Photonic topological insulator =

Material supporting topologically protected light states

In condensed matter physics and optics, a photonic topological insulator is an artificial materials that support topologically non-trivial, unidirectional states of light. Photonic topological phases are classical electromagnetic wave analogues of electronic topological phases studied in condensed matter physics. Similar to electronic topological insulators, the photonic counterpart can provide robust unidirectional channels for light propagation. The field that studies these phases of light is sometimes referred to as topological photonics.

== History ==
Topological order in solid state systems has been studied in condensed matter physics since the discovery of integer quantum Hall effect. But topological matter attracted considerable interest from the physics community after the proposals for possible observation of symmetry-protected topological phases (or the so-called topological insulators) in graphene, and experimental observation of a 2D topological insulator in CdTe/HgTe/CdTe quantum wells in 2007.

In 2008, Duncan Haldane and Srinivas Raghu proposed that unidirectional electromagnetic states analogous to (integer) quantum Hall states can be realized in nonreciprocal magnetic photonic crystals. This prediction was first realized in 2009 in the microwave frequency regime. This was followed by the proposals for analogous quantum spin Hall states of electromagnetic waves that are now known as photonic topological insulators. It was later found that topological electromagnetic states can exist in continuous media as well--theoretical and numerical study has confirmed the existence of topological Langmuir-cyclotron waves in continuous magnetized plasmas.

== Platforms ==
Photonic topological insulators are designed using various photonic platforms including optical waveguide arrays, coupled ring resonators, bi-anisotropic meta-materials, and photonic crystals. More recently, they have been realized in 2D dielectric and plasmonic meta-surfaces. Despite the theoretical prediction, no experimental demonstration of photonic topological insulator in continuous media has been reported.

== Chern number ==
As an important figure of merit for characterizing the quantized collective behaviors of the wavefunction, Chern number is the topological invariant of quantum Hall insulators. Chern number also identifies the topological properties of the photonic topological insulators (PTIs), thus it is of crucial importance in PTI design. The full-wave finite-difference frequency-domain (FDFD) method based MATLAB program for computing the Chern number has been written. Recently, the finite-difference method has been extended to analyze the topological invariant of non-Hermitian topological dielectric photonic crystals by first-principle Wilson loop calculation.

== See also ==
- Metamaterial
