= Topological insulator =

State of matter with insulating bulk but conductive boundary

An (informal) phase diagram with topological insulators, trivial insulators, and conductors. There is no path from the topological insulators to the trivial insulators that does not cross the conducting phase. The diagram depicts a $\mathbb{Z}_2$topological invariant, since there are two "islands" of insulators.

An idealized band structure for a 3D time-reversal symmetric topological insulator. The Fermi level falls within the bulk band gap which is traversed by topologically-protected spin-textured Dirac surface states.

A topological insulator is a material whose interior behaves as an electrical insulator while its surface behaves as an electrical conductor, meaning that electrons can only move along the surface of the material.

A topological insulator is an insulator for the same reason a "trivial" (ordinary) insulator is: there exists an energy gap between the valence and conduction bands of the material. But in a topological insulator, these bands are, in an informal sense, "twisted", relative to a trivial insulator. The topological insulator cannot be continuously transformed into a trivial one without untwisting the bands, which closes the band gap and creates a conducting state. Thus, due to the continuity of the underlying field, the border of a topological insulator with a trivial insulator (including vacuum, which is topologically trivial) is forced to support conducting edge states.

Since this results from a global property of the topological insulator's band structure, local (symmetry-preserving) perturbations cannot damage this surface state. This is unique to topological insulators: while ordinary insulators can also support conductive surface states, only the surface states of topological insulators have this robustness property.

This leads to a more formal definition of a topological insulator: an insulator which cannot be adiabatically transformed into an ordinary insulator without passing through an intermediate conducting state. In other words, topological insulators and trivial insulators are separate regions in the phase diagram, connected only by conducting phases. In this way, topological insulators provide an example of a state of matter not described by the Landau symmetry-breaking theory that defines ordinary states of matter.

The properties of topological insulators and their surface states are highly dependent on both the dimension of the material and its underlying symmetries, and can be classified using the so-called periodic table of topological insulators. Some combinations of dimension and symmetries forbid topological insulators completely. All topological insulators have at least U(1) symmetry from particle number conservation, and often have time-reversal symmetry from the absence of a magnetic field. In this way, topological insulators are an example of symmetry-protected topological order. So-called "topological invariants", taking values in $\mathbb{Z}_2$ or $\mathbb{Z}$, allow classification of insulators as trivial or topological, and can be computed by various methods.

The surface states of topological insulators can have exotic properties. For example, in time-reversal symmetric 3D topological insulators, surface states have their spin locked at a right-angle to their momentum (spin-momentum locking). At a given energy the only other available electronic states have different spin, so "U"-turn scattering is strongly suppressed and conduction on the surface is highly metallic.

Despite their origin in quantum mechanical systems, analogues of topological insulators can also be found in classical media. There exist photonic, magnetic, and acoustic topological insulators, among others.

== Prediction ==
The first models of 3D topological insulators were proposed by B. A. Volkov and O. A. Pankratov in 1985, and subsequently by Pankratov, S. V. Pakhomov, and Volkov in 1987. Gapless 2D Dirac states were shown to exist at the band inversion contact in PbTe/SnTe and HgTe/CdTe heterostructures. Existence of interface Dirac states in HgTe/CdTe was experimentally verified by Laurens W. Molenkamp's group in 2D topological insulators in 2007.

Later sets of theoretical models for the 2D topological insulator (also known as the quantum spin Hall insulators) were proposed by Charles L. Kane and Eugene J. Mele in 2005, and also by B. Andrei Bernevig and Shoucheng Zhang in 2006. The $\mathbb{Z}_2$ topological invariant was constructed and the importance of the time reversal symmetry was clarified in the work by Kane and Mele. Subsequently, Bernevig, Taylor L. Hughes and Zhang made a theoretical prediction that 2D topological insulator with one-dimensional (1D) helical edge states would be realized in quantum wells (very thin layers) of mercury telluride sandwiched between cadmium telluride. The transport due to 1D helical edge states was indeed observed in the experiments by Molenkamp's group in 2007.

Although the topological classification and the importance of time-reversal symmetry were pointed in the 2000s, all the necessary ingredients and physics of topological insulators were already understood in the works from the 1980s.

In 2007, it was predicted that 3D topological insulators might be found in binary compounds involving bismuth, and in particular "strong topological insulators" exist that cannot be reduced to multiple copies of the quantum spin Hall state.

== Properties and applications ==
Spin-momentum locking in the topological insulator allows symmetry-protected surface states to host Majorana particles if superconductivity is induced on the surface of 3D topological insulators via proximity effects. (Note that Majorana zero-mode can also appear without topological insulators.) The non-trivialness of topological insulators is encoded in the existence of a gas of helical Dirac fermions. Dirac particles which behave like massless relativistic fermions have been observed in 3D topological insulators. Note that the gapless surface states of topological insulators differ from those in the quantum Hall effect: the gapless surface states of topological insulators are symmetry-protected (i.e., not topological), while the gapless surface states in quantum Hall effect are topological (i.e., robust against any local perturbations that can break all the symmetries). The $\mathbb{Z}_2$ topological invariants cannot be measured using traditional transport methods, such as spin Hall conductance, and the transport is not quantized by the $\mathbb{Z}_2$ invariants. An experimental method to measure $\mathbb{Z}_2$ topological invariants was demonstrated which provide a measure of the $\mathbb{Z}_2$ topological order. (Note that the term $\mathbb{Z}_2$ topological order has also been used to describe the topological order with emergent $\mathbb{Z}_2$ gauge theory discovered in 1991.) More generally (in what is known as the ten-fold way) for each spatial dimensionality, each of the ten Altland—Zirnbauer symmetry classes of random Hamiltonians labelled by the type of discrete symmetry (time-reversal symmetry, particle-hole symmetry, and chiral symmetry) has a corresponding group of topological invariants (either $\mathbb{Z}$, $\mathbb{Z}_2$ or trivial) as described by the periodic table of topological invariants.

The most promising applications of topological insulators are spintronic devices and dissipationless transistors for quantum computers based on the quantum Hall effect and quantum anomalous Hall effect. In addition, topological insulator materials have also found practical applications in advanced magnetoelectronic and optoelectronic devices.

=== Thermoelectrics ===
Some of the most well-known topological insulators are also thermoelectric materials, such as Bi_{2}Te_{3} and its alloys with Bi_{2}Se_{3} (n-type thermoelectrics) and Sb_{2}Te_{3} (p-type thermoelectrics). High thermoelectric power conversion efficiency is realized in materials with low thermal conductivity, high electrical conductivity, and high Seebeck coefficient (i.e., the incremental change in voltage due to an incremental change in temperature). Topological insulators are often composed of heavy atoms, which tends to lower thermal conductivity and are therefore beneficial for thermoelectrics. A recent study also showed that good electrical characteristics (i.e., high electrical conductivity and Seebeck coefficient) can arise in topological insulators due to warping of the bulk band structure, which is driven by band inversion. Often, the electrical conductivity and Seebeck coefficient are conflicting properties of thermoelectrics and difficult to optimize simultaneously. Band warping, induced by band inversion in a topological insulator, can mediate the two properties by reducing the effective mass of electrons/holes and increasing the valley degeneracy (i.e., the number of electronic bands that are contributing to charge transport). As a result, topological insulators are generally interesting candidates for thermoelectric applications.

== Theoretical background ==
=== Topology of the Brillouin zone ===
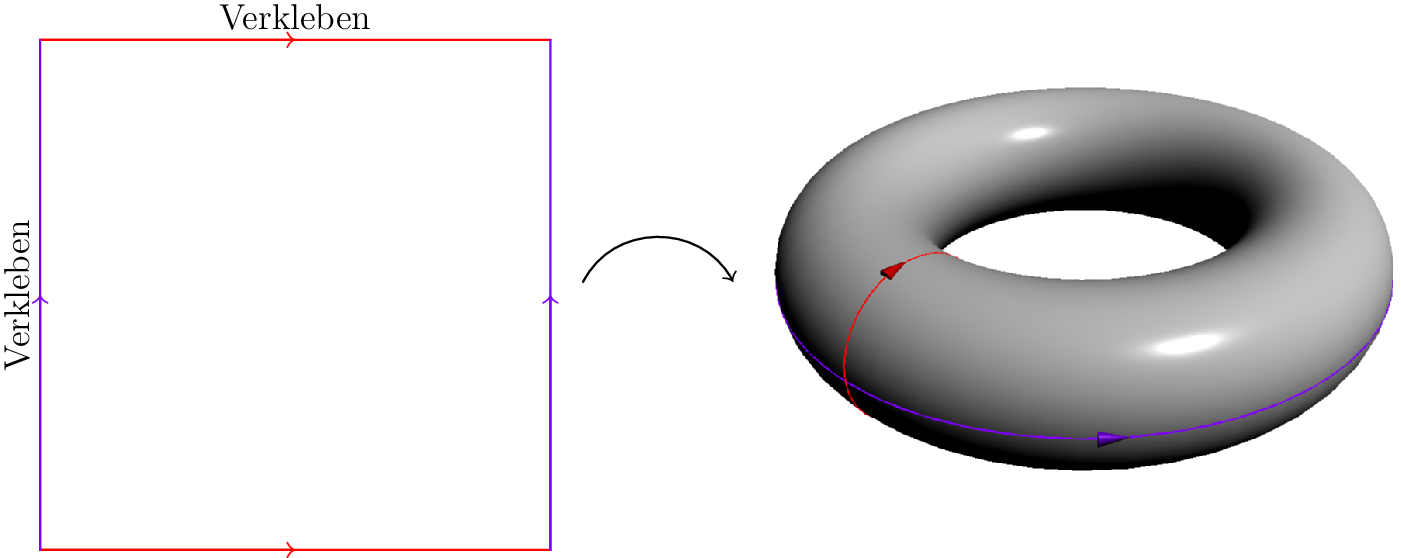
When one glues the opposite edges of the two dimensional plane, one obtains a torus. This is the appropriate construction to describe the two-dimensional Brillouin zone, where opposite edges differ by a reciprocal lattice vector.

A periodic system is, by definition, invariant under some translations, allowing us to label the eigenstates of a periodic Hamiltonian by the eigenvalues of the translation operators that leave the system unchanged. The eigenvalues of the translation operator are called crystal momenta (or quasimomenta) and are usually written as $\mathbf{k}=(k_1,k_2,...,k_d)$ (where d is the number of dimensions of the system). Those quantum numbers play a role analogous to the wavevector of a free particle. The periodicity of the crystal induces a periodicity in k-space: $\mathbf{k}$ and $\mathbf{k}+\mathbf{G}$, where $\mathbf{G}$ is a reciprocal wavevector, describe the same state (or sets of states). The set of all quasimomenta that are not equivalent up to a reciprocal wavevector is called the Brillouin zone. As a consequence of the periodicity of the Brillouin zone, its opposite edges or faces should be identified with each other, therefore the Brillouin zone describes a d-dimensional torus, $T^d$.

=== Two-band Hamiltonians ===
The topological insulators that are easiest to describe are periodic crystalline insulators with two degrees of freedom (e.g. two orbitals) per unit cell. Although a lot of the following treatment is only true for those systems, it is easily generalizable to any crystalline topological insulator. Some notable examples of two-band systems are graphene and the Su–Schrieffer–Heeger model (describing polyacetylene). By separating the degrees of freedom from inside and outside the cell, one can write the wavefunction as
$$|\psi_{\mathbf{k}}\rangle = \frac{1}{\sqrt{N}}\sum_m e^{i\mathbf{k}\cdot \mathbf{R}_m}|m\rangle \otimes |\alpha\rangle
\equiv |\mathbf{k}\rangle \otimes |\alpha\rangle$$
where $m$ labels the unit cell, $\mathbf{R}_m$ are lattice vectors, $N$ is the number of unit cells (which may or may not be infinite) and $|\alpha\rangle$ is the internal state of a unit cell, which in our case can be generically written $|\alpha\rangle = a|A\rangle + b|B\rangle$ (where A and B are the internal degrees of freedom). Due to Bloch's theorem, this basis block-diagonalizes the Hamiltonian. One such block, $h_\mathbf{k}\equiv \langle \mathbf{k} | H | \mathbf{k} \rangle$ corresponding to the quasimomentum $\mathbf{k}$, can be represented by a $2 \times 2$ hermitian matrix for the two-band case (this matrix is often called the Bloch Hamiltonian). Any $2 \times 2$ hermitian matrix can be written as a linear combination of Pauli matrices, $\sigma^1, \sigma^2$ and $\sigma^3$ and the identity matrix. Hence any two-band periodic Hamiltonian can be written as
$$h_\mathbf{k}=d_i(\mathbf{k})\sigma^i+d_0(\mathbf{k})I$$
where summation over repeated indices is assumed, $d_i$ is a three dimensional real valued vector, and $I$ is the identity matrix. The advantage of this formulation is that the Hamiltonian can now be viewed as a vector in $\mathbb{R}^3$, and n-dimensional subsets of the Brillouin zone now parametrize a n-dimensional surfaces in $\mathbb{R}^3$. In this sense, we can think of $\mathbf{d}=(d_1,d_2,d_3)$ as a mapping between two spaces:
$$\mathbf{d} : T^d \to \mathbb{R}^3$$
$T^d$ corresponds to k-space and $\mathbb{R}^3$ in our case corresponds to the space of $2 \times 2$ hermitian matrices. Moreover, this basis of the Hamiltonian allows to perform scalar products and rotations of vectors $\mathbf{d}$. The latter is of particular interest since $\sigma^3$ is diagonal, meaning $h_\mathbf{k}$ can be diagonalized by rotating $\mathbf{d}$ to be parallel to the $z$ axis. Therefore, there exists a unitary matrix of the form $R_\mathbf{k}=\exp[i\mathbf{\theta(\mathbf{k}})\cdot \frac{\mathbf{\sigma}}{2}]$ such that
$$R_\mathbf{k} h_\mathbf{k} R_\mathbf{k}^\dagger=
\begin{pmatrix}
|\mathbf{d(\mathbf{k})}|+d_0 & 0\\
0 & -|\mathbf{d(\mathbf{k})}|+d_0
\end{pmatrix}$$
where $\mathbf{\theta}(\mathbf{k})$ is the axis of rotation, and its magnitude determines the angle of rotation. The energies can be deduced from the fact that $(h_\mathbf{k}-d_0I)^2=d_i d^i$. Most importantly, the rotation $R_\mathbf{k}$ only involves the direction of $\mathbf{d}$, thus the eigenstates of $h_\mathbf{k}$ do not depend on its magnitude, and so does any quantity that only involves eigenstates.

==== Connection to topology ====
An important examples of such a quantity is the Berry connection:
$$\mathcal{A}_{\alpha,\beta}(\mathbf{k})\equiv i \langle \psi_\alpha(\mathbf{k}) |\nabla_\mathbf{k}|\psi_\beta(\mathbf{k})\rangle$$
where $\alpha$ and $\beta$ are band indices. Its integral over a path gives the geometric phase, which corresponds to the phase gained by a state during adiabatic evolution that is not due to the change in energy. In the context of band structure, such a geometric phase is called a Zak phase. In two dimensional materials, an integral of $\mathcal{A}$ over the Brillouin zone gives the Hall conductance and its integral can also be used to compute the polarization of a crystal. Notice that the Berry connection is not gauge invariant, but its integral over a closed path is, therefore only the integral of $\mathcal{A}$ over a closed domain can correspond to an observable quantity. $\mathcal{A}$ depends only on the direction of $\mathbf{d}(\mathbf{k})$, $\hat{\mathbf{d}}(\mathbf{k})$, which can be thought of as a mapping from d-torus $T^d$ to the 2-sphere $S^2$.
$$\hat{\mathbf{d}}: T^d \to S^2$$
Let $\mathcal{O} \in \mathbb{R}$ be a physically observable quantity obtained by integrating the Berry phase over $T^d$, the Brillouin zone (for example the Hall conductance). This can be seen as the composite map $\mathcal{O}(\hat{\mathbf{d}}(T^d))$

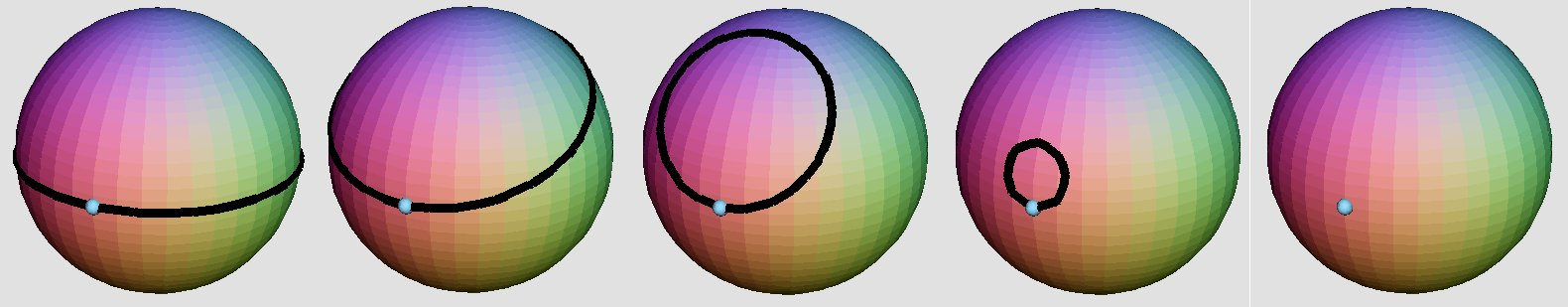
Two curves or said to be homotopically equivalent if they can be smoothly deformed into one another. Every loop on the 2-sphere can be smoothly deformed into a single point, hence all looops on the 2-sphere are homotopically equivalent.

An example of a loop with winding number 3. The curves are not superposed so that the loop can be understood better. In the example that's discussed in this section, the curve lives on $S^1$, thus it's the projection of what is shown here on the unit circle.

$$\mathcal{O}: T^d \to S^2 \to \mathbb{R}$$
Thus such an observable must depend on $\hat{\mathbf{d}}(T^d)$. Let's consider $\hat{\mathbf{d}}(T^d)$ and $\hat{\mathbf{d}}'(T^d)$, two continuous mappings from $T^d$ to $S^2$. If $\hat{\mathbf{d}}(T^d)$ can be smoothly deformed into $\hat{\mathbf{d}}'(T^d)$, they are said to be homotopically equivalent. For example a loop on a sphere can be thought as such a mapping where $T^d=S^1$is the unit circle and all loops on a sphere are homotopically equivalent since they can all be smoothly deformed into a single point. If instead $\hat{\mathbf{d}}: T^d \to S^1$, which is the case when $\mathbf{d}$ lies on a plane (and thus the Bloch Hamiltonian is only composed of two Pauli matrices), this is no longer the case: not all loops on a circle can be contracted to a point. A set of homotopically equivalent mappings is called an equivalence class. Given a manifold $M$, the set of equivalence classes of mappings between $M$ and $S^n$, with the operation of composition of the mappings, is called the n-th homotopy group of $M$, noted $\pi_n(M)$. The relevant homotopy groups for two-band systems are $\pi_2(T^d)$ and $\pi_1(T^d)$ since we can only consider mappings from closed subsets of the Brillouin zone ($T^d$) to the 2-sphere $S^2$ or the circle $S^1$(which is a subset of $S^2$). For example if we take $S^1$, the unit circle, then $\pi_1(S^1)=\mathbb{Z}$: when we map a circle to a circle, we get a loop that lives on the perimeter of the circle, such loops can wind an integer number of times around the circle and loops with a different winding number cannot be deformed into one another. Another example is $\pi_2(S^1)=\{I\}$ since every loop on a sphere can be smoothly deformed into a single point, hence all mappings from the circle to the 2-sphere are homotopically equivalent. A number that labels an element of the homotopy group is called a topological invariant. An example of such a topological invariant for the first homotopy group of a circle is the winding number mentioned before. In this case $\hat{\mathbf{d}}(\mathbf{k})=\cos(\phi(\mathbf{k}))\hat{\mathbf{x}}+\sin(\phi(\mathbf{k}))\hat{\mathbf{y}}$ and one way to compute the winding number $\nu$ is
$$\nu = \frac{1}{2\pi}\int_\Sigma d\phi(\mathbf{k})$$

==== Insulating phases as elements of the homotopy group ====
The unit vector $\hat{\mathbf{d}}(\mathbf{k})$ can be defined as $\frac{\mathbf{d}(\mathbf{k})}{|\mathbf{d}(\mathbf{k})|}$ as long as $|\mathbf{d}(\mathbf{k})| \neq 0$, therefore, curves or surfaces passing through the origin cannot be continuously mapped to the 2-sphere. Two elements of the homotopy group are separated by a discontinuity and hence they must describe curves or surfaces $\mathbf{d}(\mathbf{k})$ that can only be deformed into one another by passing through the origin in $(d_1,d_2,d_3)$space. Looking at the form of two-band Bloch Hamiltonian given above, one can see that if $|\mathbf{d}(\mathbf{k})| = 0$, the Hamiltonian becomes degenerate, and thus two bands must be touching. Therefore, according to band theory, a two-band Hamiltonian describes a conductor if $\mathbf{d}(\mathbf{k})$ passes through the origin at some point in the Brillouin zone. One can deduce from this that two elements of the homotopy group correspond to two insulating Hamiltonians separated by a conducting phase, or alternatively, those two Hamiltonians are not adiabatically connected. Pairs of Hamiltonians representing different elements of the homotopy group are said to have a different topology.

Integrals of the Berry connection $\mathcal{A}$ over the Brillouin zone cannot vary smoothly between Hamiltonians of different topology since they depend on $\hat{\mathbf{d}}(\mathcal{BZ})$ which cannot vary smoothly between those two Hamiltonians. It turns out that this integral is a topological invariant. For example, in the case where $\mathbf{d}$ lies on a plane, it can be shown, using the unitary matrix that diagonalises the Hamiltonian, $R_\mathbf{k}=\exp[i\mathbf{\theta(\mathbf{k}})\cdot \frac{\mathbf{\sigma}}{2}]$, that $\mathcal{A}(\mathbf{k})=\mathbf{\nabla}_\mathbf{k}\phi(\mathbf{k})$ (where $\phi$ is the angle on the circle), hence
$$\nu = \frac{1}{2\pi}\int_\mathcal{BZ} d\mathbf{\Sigma}\cdot \mathcal{A}(\mathbf{k})$$
is a winding number. As has been mentioned before, the topological invariants are gauge invariant and thus can be physically observable quantities. The most famous of such quantities are the number of edge states (see for example the Su-Schrieffer-Heeger model) and the Hall conductance in the integer quantum Hall effect.

== Experimental realization ==
2D Topological insulators were first realized in system containing HgTe quantum wells sandwiched between cadmium telluride in 2007.

The first 3D topological insulator to be realized experimentally was Bi_{1 − x} Sb _{x}. Bismuth in its pure state, is a semimetal with a small electronic band gap. Using angle-resolved photoemission spectroscopy, and many other measurements, it was observed that Bi_{1 − x}Sb_{x} alloy exhibits an odd surface state (SS) crossing between any pair of Kramers points and the bulk features massive Dirac fermions. Additionally, bulk Bi_{1 − x}Sb_{x} has been predicted to have 3D Dirac particles. This prediction is of particular interest due to the observation of charge quantum Hall fractionalization in 2D graphene and pure bismuth.

Shortly thereafter symmetry-protected surface states were also observed in pure antimony, bismuth selenide, bismuth telluride and antimony telluride using angle-resolved photoemission spectroscopy (ARPES). and bismuth selenide. Many semiconductors within the large family of Heusler materials are now believed to exhibit topological surface states. In some of these materials, the Fermi level actually falls in either the conduction or valence bands due to naturally occurring defects, and must be pushed into the bulk gap by doping or gating. The surface states of a 3D topological insulator is a new type of two-dimensional electron gas (2DEG) where the electron's spin is locked to its linear momentum.

Fully bulk-insulating or intrinsic 3D topological insulator states exist in Bi-based materials as demonstrated in surface transport measurements. In a new Bi based chalcogenide (Bi_{1.1}Sb_{0.9}Te_{2}S) with slightly Sn - doping, exhibits an intrinsic semiconductor behavior with Fermi energy and Dirac point lie in the bulk gap and the surface states were probed by the charge transport experiments.

It was proposed in 2008 and 2009 that topological insulators are best understood not as surface conductors per se, but as bulk 3D magnetoelectrics with a quantized magnetoelectric effect. This can be revealed by placing topological insulators in magnetic field. The effect can be described in language similar to that of the hypothetical axion particle of particle physics. The effect was reported by researchers at Johns Hopkins University and Rutgers University using THz spectroscopy who showed that the Faraday rotation was quantized by the fine structure constant.

In 2012, topological Kondo insulators were identified in samarium hexaboride, which is a bulk insulator at low temperatures.

In 2014, it was shown that magnetic components, like the ones in spin-torque computer memory, can be manipulated by topological insulators. The effect is related to metal–insulator transitions (Bose–Hubbard model).

=== Floquet topological insulators ===
Topological insulators are challenging to synthesize, and limited in topological phases accessible with solid-state materials. This has motivated the search for topological phases on the systems that simulate the same principles underlying topological insulators. Discrete time quantum walks (DTQW) have been proposed for making Floquet topological insulators (FTI). This periodically driven system simulates an effective (Floquet) Hamiltonian that is topologically nontrivial. This system replicates the effective Hamiltonians from all universal classes of 1- to 3-D topological insulators. Interestingly, topological properties of Floquet topological insulators could be controlled via an external periodic drive rather than an external magnetic field. An atomic lattice empowered by distance selective Rydberg interaction could simulate different classes of FTI over a couple of hundred sites and steps in 1, 2 or 3 dimensions. The long-range interaction allows designing topologically ordered periodic boundary conditions, further enriching the realizable topological phases.

=== Synthesis ===
Topological insulators can be grown using different methods such as metal-organic chemical vapor deposition (MOCVD),

physical vapor deposition (PVD), solvothermal synthesis, sonochemical technique and molecular beam epitaxy

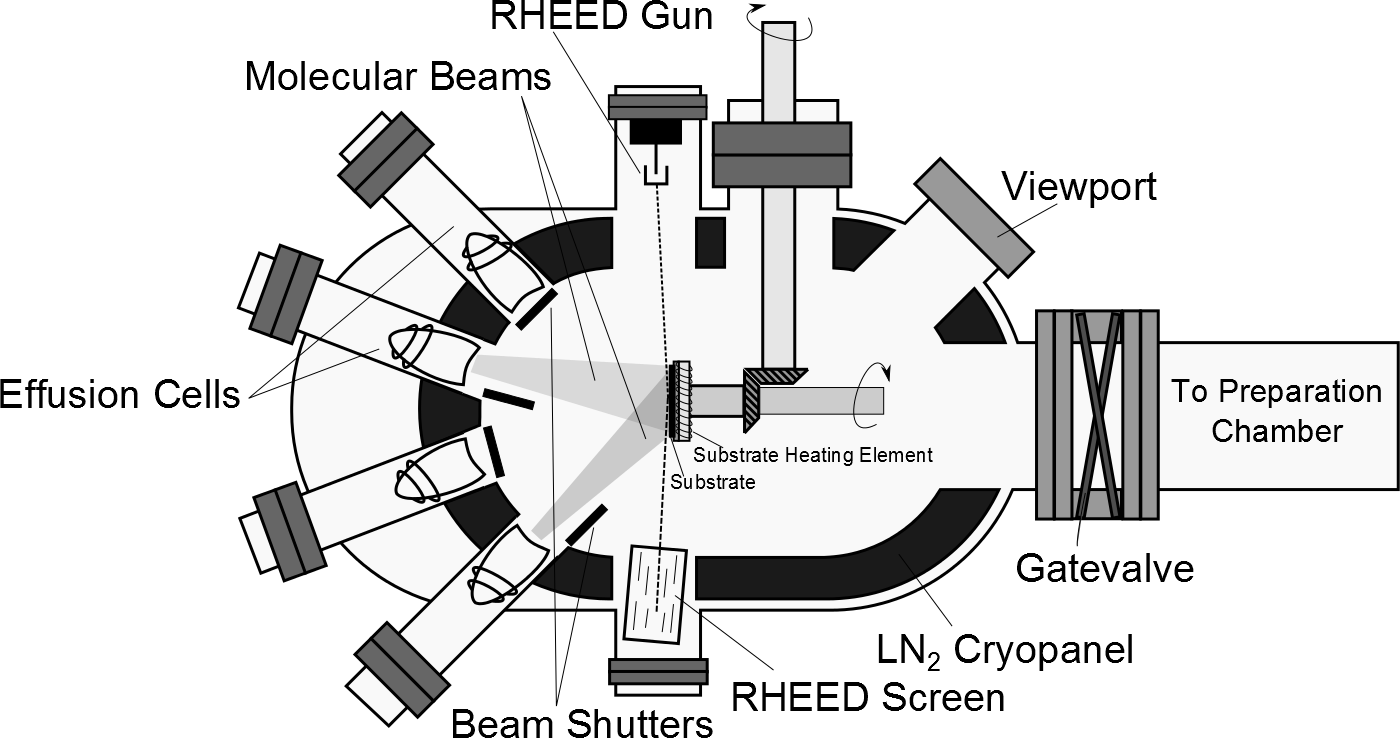
Schematic of the components of a MBE system

(MBE). MBE has so far been the most common experimental technique. The growth of thin film topological insulators is governed by weak van der Waals interactions. The weak interaction allows to exfoliate the thin film from bulk crystal with a clean and perfect surface. The van der Waals interactions in epitaxy also known as van der Waals epitaxy (VDWE), is a phenomenon governed by weak van der Waals interactions between layered materials of different or same elements in which the materials are stacked on top of each other. This approach allows the growth of layered topological insulators on other substrates for heterostructure and integrated circuits.

=== MBE growth of topological insulators ===
Molecular beam epitaxy (MBE) is an epitaxy method for the growth of a crystalline material on a crystalline substrate to form an ordered layer. MBE is performed in high vacuum or ultra-high vacuum, the elements are heated in different electron beam evaporators until they sublime. The gaseous elements then condense on the wafer where they react with each other to form single crystals.

MBE is an appropriate technique for the growth of high quality single-crystal films. In order to avoid a huge lattice mismatch and defects at the interface, the substrate and thin film are expected to have similar lattice constants. MBE has an advantage over other methods due to the fact that the synthesis is performed in high vacuum hence resulting in less contamination. Additionally, lattice defect is reduced due to the ability to influence the growth rate and the ratio of species of source materials present at the substrate interface. Furthermore, in MBE, samples can be grown layer by layer which results in flat surfaces with smooth interface for engineered heterostructures. Moreover, MBE synthesis technique benefits from the ease of moving a topological insulator sample from the growth chamber to a characterization chamber such as angle-resolved photoemission spectroscopy (ARPES) or scanning tunneling microscopy (STM) studies.

Due to the weak van der Waals bonding, which relaxes the lattice-matching condition, TI can be grown on a wide variety of substrates such as Si(111), Al_{2}O_{3}, GaAs(111), InP(111), CdS(0001) and Y_{3}Fe_{5}O_{12} .

=== PVD growth of topological insulators ===
The physical vapor deposition (PVD) technique does not suffer from the disadvantages of the exfoliation method and, at the same time, it is much simpler and cheaper than the fully controlled growth by molecular-beam epitaxy. The PVD method enables a reproducible synthesis of single crystals of various layered quasi-two-dimensional materials including topological insulators (i.e., Bi_{2}Se_{3}, Bi_{2}Te_{3}). The resulted single crystals have a well-defined crystallographic orientation; their composition, thickness, size, and the surface density on the desired substrate can be controlled. The thickness control is particularly important for 3D TIs in which the trivial (bulky) electronic channels usually dominate the transport properties and mask the response of the topological (surface) modes. By reducing the thickness, one lowers the contribution of trivial bulk channels into the total conduction, thus forcing the topological modes to carry the electric current.

==== Bismuth-based topological insulators ====
Thus far, the field of topological insulators has been focused on bismuth and antimony chalcogenide based materials such as Bi_{2}Se_{3}, Bi_{2}Te_{3}, Sb_{2}Te_{3} or Bi_{1 − x}Sb_{x}, Bi_{1.1}Sb_{0.9}Te_{2}S. The choice of chalcogenides is related to the van der Waals relaxation of the lattice matching strength which restricts the number of materials and substrates. Bismuth chalcogenides have been studied extensively for TIs and their applications in thermoelectric materials. The van der Waals interaction in TIs exhibit important features due to low surface energy. For instance, the surface of Bi_{2}Te_{3} is usually terminated by Te due to its low surface energy.

Bismuth chalcogenides have been successfully grown on different substrates. In particular, Si has been a good substrate for the successful growth of Bi_{2}Te_{3} . However, the use of sapphire as substrate has not been so encouraging due to a large mismatch of about 15%. The selection of appropriate substrate can improve the overall properties of TI. The use of buffer layer can reduce the lattice match hence improving the electrical properties of TI. Bi_{2}Se_{3} can be grown on top of various Bi_{2 − x}In_{x}Se_{3} buffers. Table 1 shows Bi_{2}Se_{3}, Bi_{2}Te_{3}, Sb_{2}Te_{3} on different substrates and the resulting lattice mismatch. Generally, regardless of the substrate used, the resulting films have a textured surface that is characterized by pyramidal single-crystal domains with quintuple-layer steps. The size and relative proportion of these pyramidal domains vary with factors that include film thickness, lattice mismatch with the substrate and interfacial chemistry-dependent film nucleation. The synthesis of thin films have the stoichiometry problem due to the high vapor pressures of the elements. Thus, binary tetradymites are extrinsically doped as n-type (Bi_{2}Se_{3}, Bi_{2}Te_{3} ) or p-type (Sb_{2}Te_{3} ). Due to the weak van der Waals bonding, graphene is one of the preferred substrates for TI growth despite the large lattice mismatch.

===== Lattice mismatch of different substrates =====
Substrate	Bi_{2}Se_{3} %	Bi_{2}Te_{3} %	Sb_{2}Te_{3} %
graphene	−40.6	−43.8	−42.3
Si	−7.3	−12.3	−9.7
CaF_{2}	−6.8	−11.9	−9.2
GaAs	−3.4	−8.7	−5.9
CdS	−0.2	−5.7	−2.8
InP	0.2	−5.3	−2.3
BaF_{2}	5.9	0.1	2.8
CdTe	10.7	4.6	7.8
Al_{2}O_{3}	14.9	8.7	12.0
SiO_{2}	18.6	12.1	15.5

=== Identification ===
The first step of topological insulators identification takes place right after synthesis, meaning without breaking the vacuum and moving the sample to an atmosphere. That could be done by using angle-resolved photoemission spectroscopy (ARPES) or scanning tunneling microscopy (STM) techniques. Further measurements includes structural and chemical probes such as X-ray diffraction and energy-dispersive spectroscopy but depending on the sample quality, the lack of sensitivity could remain. Transport measurements cannot uniquely pinpoint the $\mathbb{Z}_2$ topology by definition of the state.

== Classification ==
Bloch's theorem allows a full characterization of the wave propagation properties of a material by assigning a matrix to each wave vector in the Brillouin zone.

Mathematically, this assignment creates a vector bundle. Different materials will have different wave propagation properties, and thus different vector bundles. If we consider all insulators (materials with a band gap), this creates a space of vector bundles. It is the topology of this space (modulo trivial bands) from which the "topology" in topological insulators arises.

Specifically, the number of connected components of the space indicates how many different "islands" of insulators exist amongst the metallic states. Insulators in the connected component containing the vacuum state are identified as "trivial", and all other insulators as "topological". The connected component in which an insulator lies can be identified with a number, referred to as a "topological invariant".

This space can be restricted under the presence of symmetries, changing the resulting topology. Although unitary symmetries are usually significant in quantum mechanics, they have no effect on the topology here. Instead, the three symmetries typically considered are time-reversal symmetry, particle-hole symmetry, and chiral symmetry (also called sublattice symmetry). Mathematically, these are represented as, respectively: an anti-unitary operator which commutes with the Hamiltonian; an anti-unitary operator which anti-commutes with the Hamiltonian; and a unitary operator which anti-commutes with the Hamiltonian. All combinations of the three together with each spatial dimension result in the so-called periodic table of topological insulators.

== Future developments ==
The field of topological insulators still needs to be developed. The best bismuth chalcogenide topological insulators have about 10 meV bandgap variation due to the charge. Further development should focus on the examination of both: the presence of high-symmetry electronic bands and simply synthesized materials. One of the candidates is half-Heusler compounds. These crystal structures can consist of a large number of elements. Band structures and energy gaps are very sensitive to the valence configuration; because of the increased likelihood of intersite exchange and disorder, they are also very sensitive to specific crystalline configurations. A nontrivial band structure that exhibits band ordering analogous to that of the known 2D and 3D TI materials was predicted in a variety of 18-electron half-Heusler compounds using first-principles calculations. These materials have not yet shown any sign of intrinsic topological insulator behavior in actual experiments.

== See also ==
- Topological quantum computer
- Topological quantum field theory
- Topological quantum number
- Photonic topological insulator
