= Zak phase =

Phase in insulators

In physics, the Zak phase is the Berry phase of a Bloch wavefunction evaluated on a noncontractible loop in the Brillouin zone. In other words, it's the geometric phase acquired by an electron in a crystal as its wave vector, $\mathbf{k}$, slowly (more precisely, adiabatically) loops over the Brillouin zone. Because the (abelian) Berry phase is only defined for an adiabatic evolution, the Zak phase is only defined for systems where for any given $\mathbf{k}$ there are no degeneracies, which corresponds to an insulator. Furthermore, certain symmetries, such as chiral symmetry, may cause the Zak phase to be quantized, in which case the Zak phase will be an adiabatic invariant. In the presence of such symmetries, the Zak phase may be used to give a topological index to a given phase. Insulating Hamiltonians with a nontrivial quantized Zak phase are topological insulators.
