= Polyacetylene =

Organic polymer made of the repeating unit [C2H2]

- trans-polyacetylene Skeletal formula of trans-polyacetylene

- cis-polyacetylene Skeletal formula of cis-polyacetylene

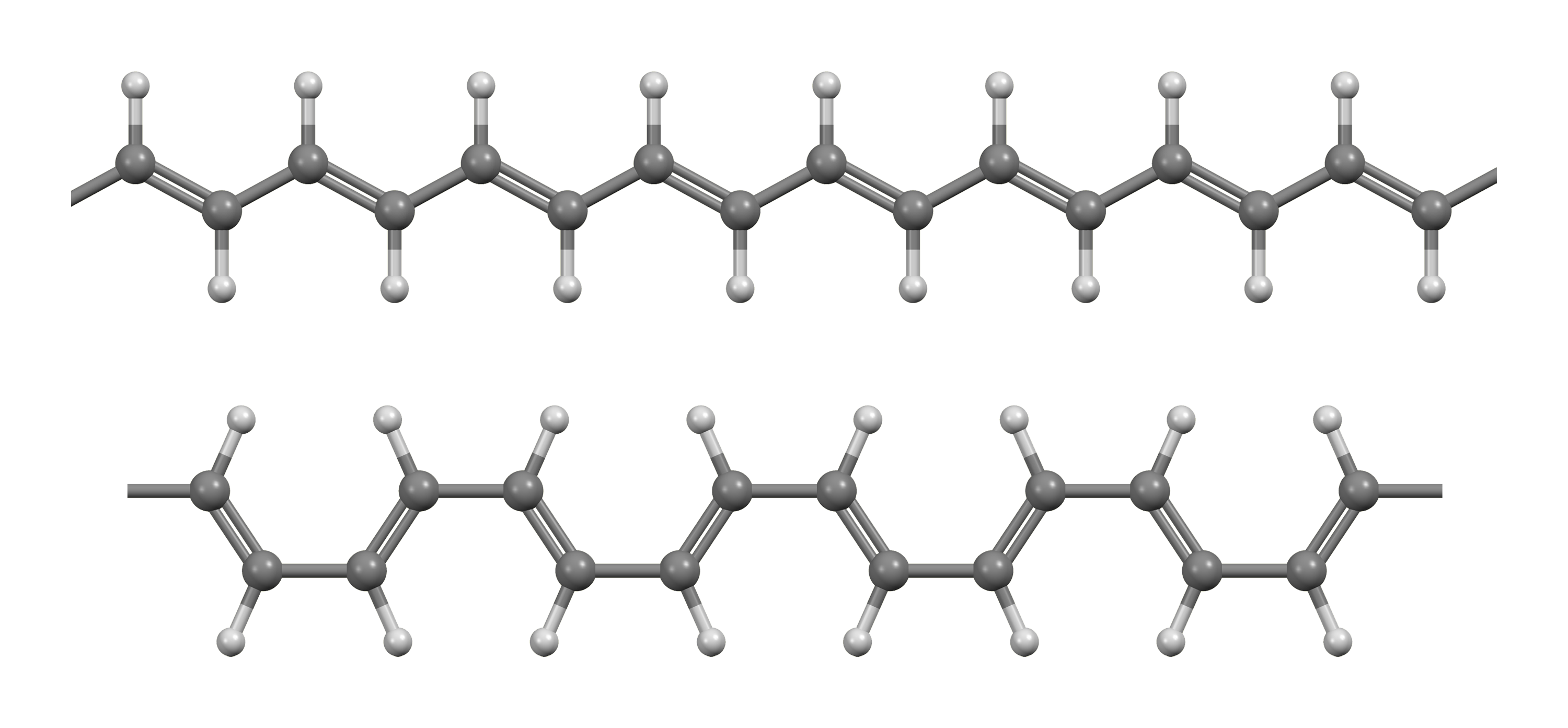
- Ball-and-stick models of the transoidal (top) and cisoidal (bottom) conformations of the trans isomer

Names
- IUPAC name Polyethyne
- Other names Polyacetylene, PAc

Identifiers
CAS Number	25067-58-7
ChemSpider	none

Properties
Chemical formula	[C_{2}H_{2}]_{n}
Solubility in water	insoluble

Related compounds
Related compounds	Acetylene gas (monomer)

Hazards
- GHS labelling
Pictograms	(GHS02: Flammable)
- Except where otherwise noted, data are given for materials in their standard state (at 25 °C [77 °F], 100 kPa). verify (what is ?) Infobox references

Polyacetylene (IUPAC name: polyethyne) usually refers to an organic polymer with the repeating unit [C_{2}H_{2}]_{n}. The name refers to its conceptual construction from polymerization of acetylene to give a chain with repeating olefin groups (a conjugated polyene). This compound is conceptually important, as the discovery of polyacetylene and its high conductivity upon doping helped to launch the field of organic conductive polymers. The high electrical conductivity discovered by Hideki Shirakawa, Alan Heeger, and Alan MacDiarmid for this polymer led to intense interest in the use of organic compounds in microelectronics (organic semiconductors). This discovery was recognized by the Nobel Prize in Chemistry in 2000. Early work in the field of polyacetylene research was aimed at using doped polymers as easily processable and lightweight "plastic metals". Despite the promise of this polymer in the field of conductive polymers, many of its properties such as instability to air and difficulty with processing have led to avoidance in commercial applications.

Compounds called polyacetylenes also occur in nature, although in this context the term refers to polyynes, compounds containing multiple acetylene groups ("poly" meaning many), rather than to chains of olefin groups ("poly" meaning polymerization of).

== Structure ==
A segment of trans-polyacetylene

Structural diagram

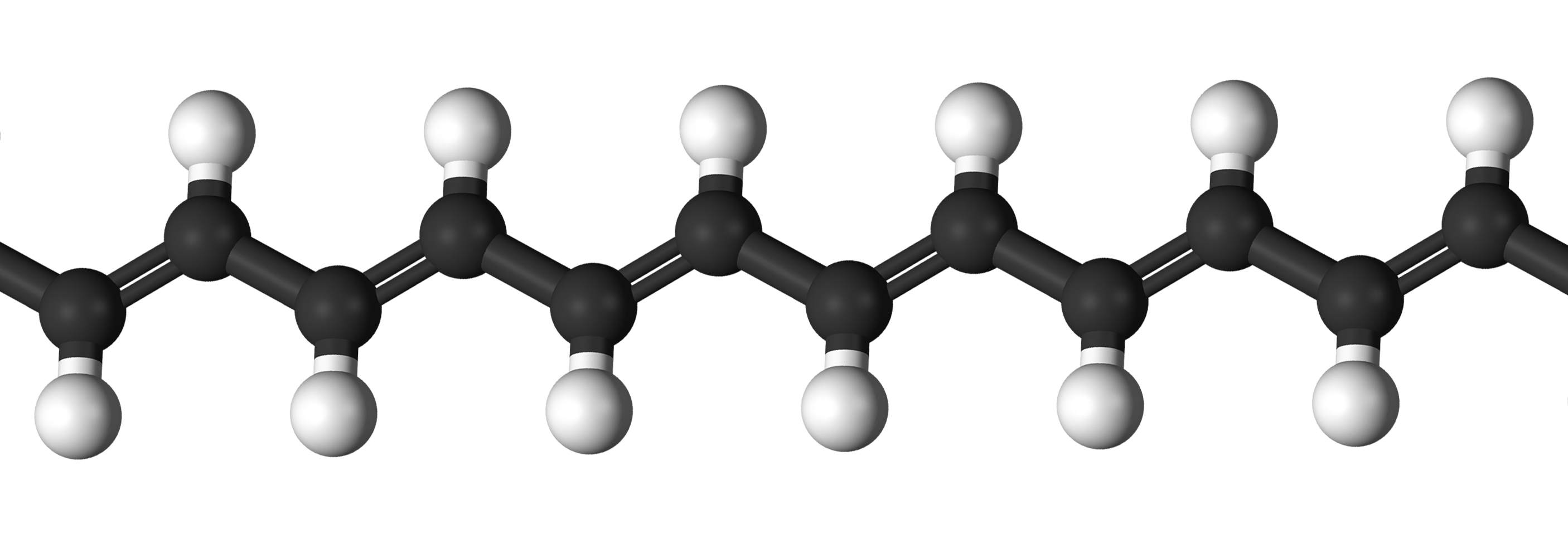
Ball-and-stick model

Polyacetylene consists of a long chain of carbon atoms with alternating single and double bonds between them, each with one hydrogen atom. The double bonds can have either cis or trans geometry. The controlled synthesis of each isomer of the polymer, cis-polyacetylene or trans-polyacetylene, can be achieved by changing the temperature at which the reaction is conducted. The cis form of the polymer is thermodynamically less stable than the trans isomer. Despite the conjugated nature of the polyacetylene backbone, not all of the carbon–carbon bonds in the material are equal: a distinct single/double alternation exists. Each hydrogen atom can be replaced by a functional group. Substituted polyacetylenes tend to be more rigid than saturated polymers. Furthermore, placing different functional groups as substituents on the polymer backbone leads to a twisted conformation of the polymer chain to interrupt the conjugation.

== History ==
One of the earliest reported acetylene polymers was named cuprene. Its highly cross-linked nature led to no further studies in the field for quite some time. Linear polyacetylene was first prepared by Giulio Natta in 1958. The resulting polyacetylene was linear, of high molecular weight, displayed high crystallinity, and had a regular structure. X-ray diffraction studies demonstrated that the resulting polyacetylene was trans-polyacetylene. After this first reported synthesis, few chemists were interested in polyacetylene because the product of Natta's preparation was an insoluble, air sensitive, infusible black powder.

The next major development of polyacetylene polymerization was made by Hideki Shirakawa's group who prepared silvery films of polyacetylene. They discovered that the polymerization of polyacetylene could be achieved at the surface of a concentrated solution of the catalyst system of Et_{3}Al and Ti(OBu)_{4} in an inert solvent such as toluene. In parallel with Shirakawa's studies, Alan Heeger and Alan MacDiarmid were studying the metallic properties of polythiazyl [(SN)_{x}], a related but inorganic polymer. Polythiazyl caught Heeger's interest as a chain-like metallic material, and he collaborated with Alan MacDiarmid who had previous experience with this material. By the early 1970s, this polymer was known to be superconductive at low temperatures. Shirakawa, Heeger, and MacDiarmid collaborated on further development of polyacetylene.

Upon doping polyacetylene with I_{2}, the conductivity increased seven orders of magnitude. Similar results were achieved using Cl_{2} and Br_{2}. These materials exhibited the largest room temperature conductivity observed for a covalent organic polymer, and this seminal report was key in furthering the development of organic conductive polymers. Further studies led to improved control of the cis/trans isomer ratio and demonstrated that cis-polyacetylene doping led to higher conductivity than doping of trans-polyacetylene. Doping cis-polyacetylene with AsF_{5} further increased the conductivities, bringing them close to that of copper. Furthermore, it was found that heat treatment of the catalyst used for polymerization led to films with higher conductivities.

To account for such an increase in conductivity in polyacetylene, J. R. Schrieffer and Heeger considered the existence of topologically protected solitonic defects, their model is now known as the Su–Schrieffer–Heeger model, which has served as model in other contexts to understand topological insulators.

== Synthesis ==
=== From acetylene ===
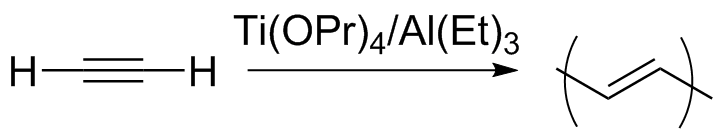
Ziegler–Natta scheme

A variety of methods have been developed to synthesize polyacetylene. One of the most common methods is via passing acetylene gas over a Ziegler–Natta catalyst, such as Ti(OiPr)_{4}/Al(C_{2}H_{5})_{3}. This method allows control over the structure and properties of the final polymer by varying temperature and catalyst loading. Mechanistic studies suggest that this polymerization involves metal insertion into the triple bond of acetylene.

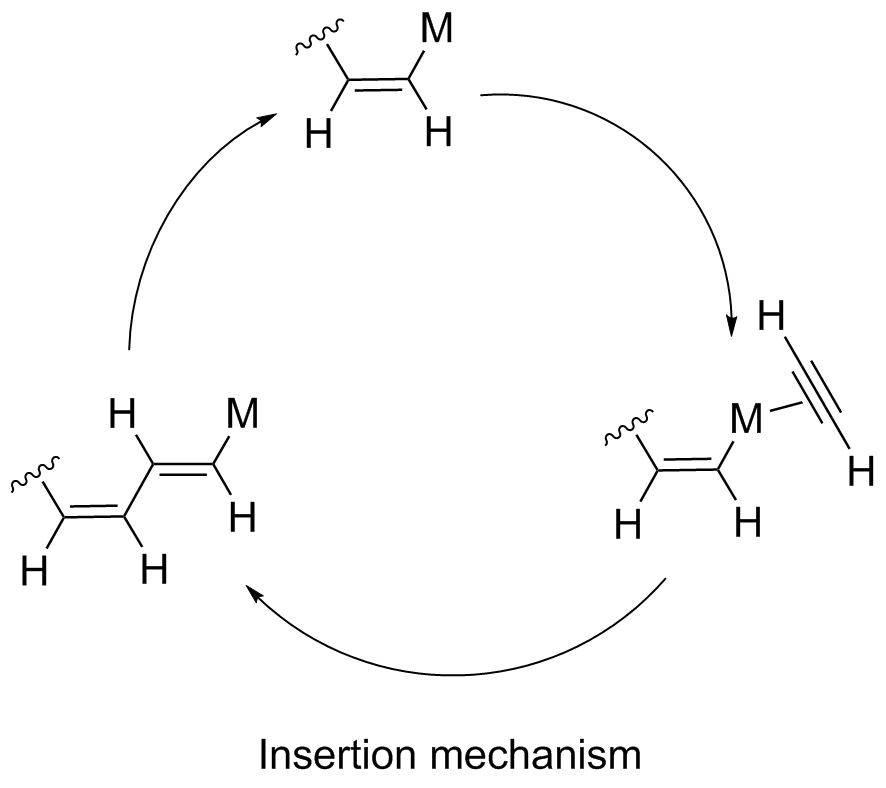
Mechanism of polyacetylene synthesis from acetylene and a metal catalyst

By varying the apparatus and catalyst loading, Shirakawa and coworkers synthesized polyacetylene as thin films, rather than insoluble black powders. They obtained these films by coating the walls of a reaction flask under inert conditions with a solution of the Ziegler–Natta catalyst and adding gaseous acetylene resulting in immediate formation of a film. Enkelmann and coworkers further improved polyacetylene synthesis by changing the catalyst to a Co(NO_{3})_{2}/NaBH_{4} system, which was stable to both oxygen and water.

Polyacetylene can also be produced via photopolymerization of acetylene, avoiding the use of catalysts and solvents. Glow-discharge, gamma, and ultraviolet irradiation have all been used. This method however requires cryogenics to produce usable polymers. Gas-phase polymerization typically produces irregular cuprene, whereas liquid-phase polymerization, conducted at −78 °C produces linear cis-polyacetylene, and solid-phase polymerization, conducted at still lower temperature, produces trans-polyacetylene.

=== Ring-opening metathesis polymerization ===
Polyacetylene can be synthesized by ring-opening metathesis polymerisation (ROMP) from cyclooctatetraene, a precursor that is more expensive but easier to handle than the acetylene monomer. This synthetic route also provides a means for introducing solubilizing groups to the polymer while maintaining the conjugation. Polymers with linear groups such as n-octyl had high conductivity but low solubility, while highly branched tert-butyl groups increased solubility but decreased conjugation due to polymer twisting to avoid steric crowding. They obtained soluble and conductive polymers with sec-butyl and neopentyl groups, because the methylene (CH_{2}) unit directly connected to the polymer reduces steric crowding and prevents twisting.

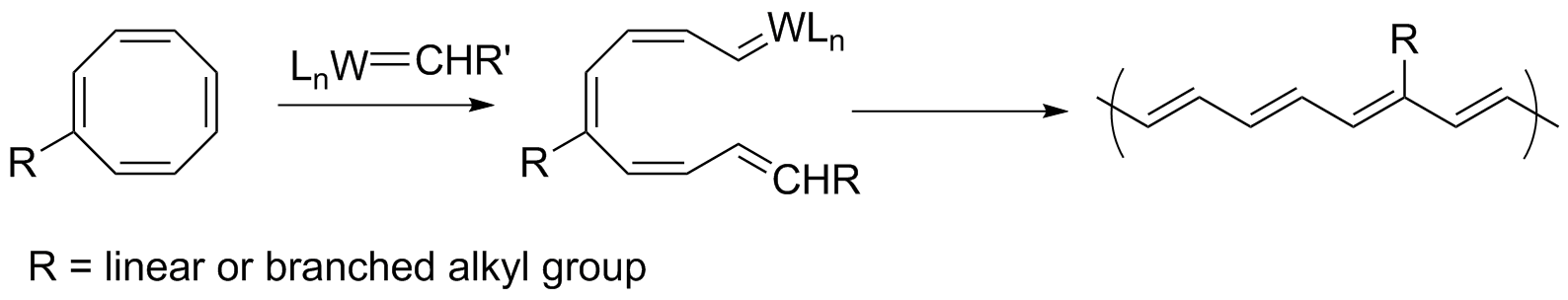
Grubbs route to polyacetylene

=== From precursor polymers ===
Polyacetylene can also be synthesized from other polymers. This method enables modification and processing of the polymer before conversion into the highly insoluble polyacetylene. Short, irregular segments of polyacetylene can be obtained by dehydrohalogenation of poly(vinyl chloride):

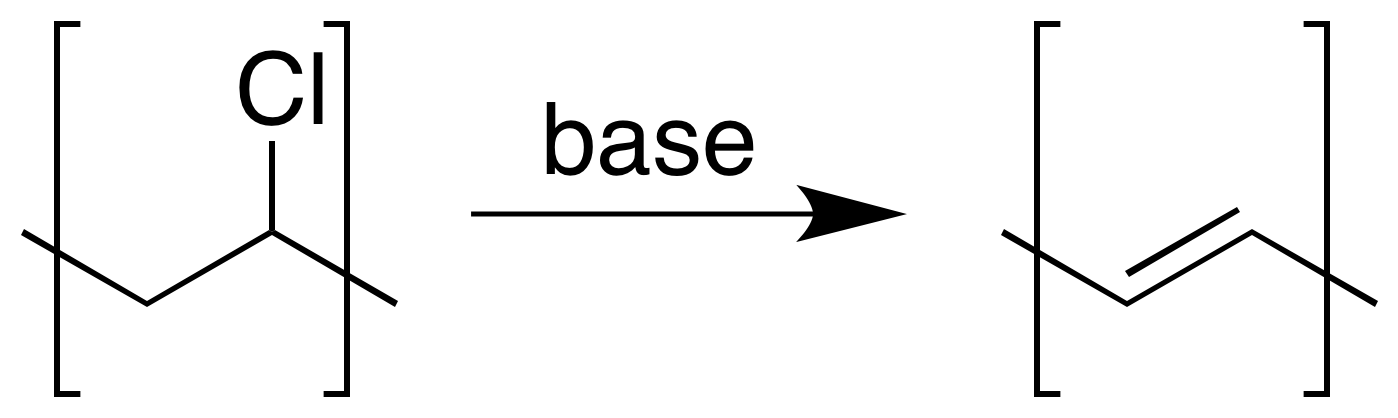

More efficient methods for synthesizing long polyacetylene chains exist and include the Durham precursor route in which precursor polymers are prepared by ring-opening metathesis polymerization, and a subsequent heat-induced retro-Diels–Alder reaction yields the final polymer, as well as volatile side products.

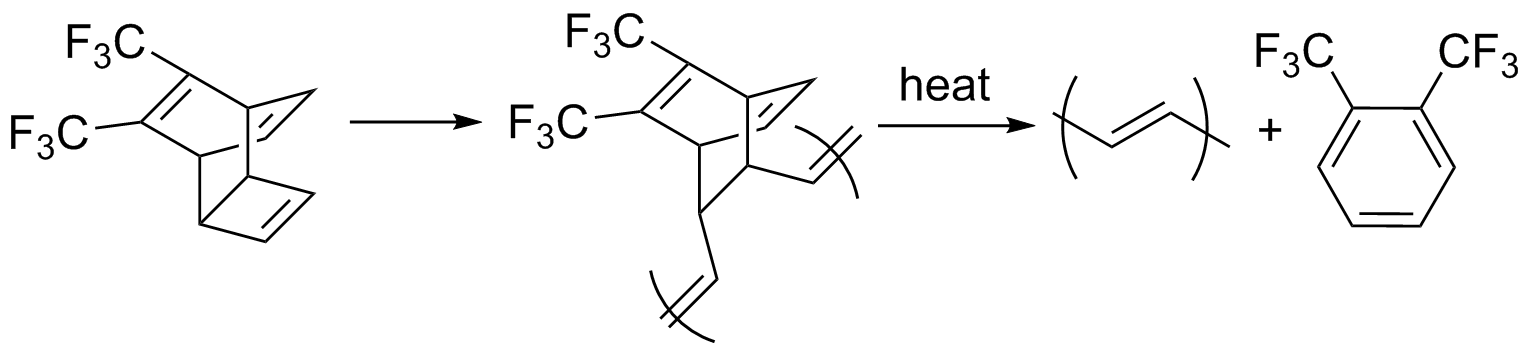
Durham precursor polymer (Reverse Diels–Alder) route to polyacetylene

== Doping ==
When polyacetylene films are exposed to vapors of electron-accepting compounds (p-type dopants), the electrical conductivity of the material increases by orders of magnitude over the undoped material. p-Type dopants include Br_{2}, I_{2}, Cl_{2}, and AsF_{5}. These dopants act by abstracting an electron from the polymer chain. The conductivity of these polymers is believed to be a result of the creation of charge-transfer complexes between the polymer and halogen. Charge transfer occurs from the polymer to the acceptor compound; the polyacetylene chain acts as a cation and the acceptor as an anion. The "hole" on the polymer backbone is weakly associated with the anionic acceptor by Coulomb potential. Polyacetylene doped with (p-type) dopants retain their high conductivity even after exposure to air for several days.

Electron-donating (n-type) dopants can also be used to create conductive polyacetylene. n-Type dopants for polyacetylene include lithium, sodium, and potassium. As with p-type dopants, charge-transfer complexes are created, where the polymer backbone is anionic and the donor is cationic. The increase in conductivity upon treatment with an n-type dopant is not as significant as those achieved upon treatment with a p-type dopant. Polyacetylene chains doped with n-type dopants are extremely sensitive to air and moisture.

Polyacetylene can also be doped electrochemically.

The conductivity of polyacetylene depends on structure and doping. Undoped trans-polyacetylene films have a conductivity of 4.4×10^{−5} Ω^{−1}cm^{−1}, while cis-polyacetylene has a lower conductivity of 1.7×10^{−9} Ω^{−1}cm^{−1}. Doping with bromine causes an increase in conductivity to 0.5 Ω^{−1}cm^{−1}, while a higher conductivity of 38 Ω^{−1}cm^{−1} is obtained through doping with iodine. Doping of either cis- or trans-polyacetylene leads to an increase in their conductivities by at least six orders of magnitude. Doped cis-polyacetylene films usually have conductivities two or three times greater than doped trans-polyacetylene even though the parent film has lower conductivity.

== Properties ==
The structure of polyacetylene films have been examined by both infrared spectroscopy and Raman spectroscopy, and found that the structure depends on synthetic conditions. When the synthesis is performed below −78 °C, the cis form predominates, while above 150 °C the trans form is favored. At room temperature, the polymerization yields a ratio of 60:40 cis:trans. Films containing the cis form appear coppery, while the trans form is silvery. Films of cis-polyacetylene are very flexible and can be readily stretched, while trans-polyacetylene is much more brittle.

The synthesis and processing of polyacetylene films affects the properties. Increasing the catalyst ratio creates thicker films with a greater draw ratio, allowing them to be stretched further. Lower catalyst loadings leads to the formation of dark red gels, which can be converted to films by cutting and pressing between glass plates. A foam-like material can be obtained from the gel by displacing the solvent with benzene, then freezing and subliming the benzene. Polyacetylene has a bulk density of 0.4 g/cm^{3}, while density of the foam is significantly lower, at 0.02–0.04 g/cm^{3}. The morphology consists of fibrils, with an average width of 200 Å. These fibrils form an irregular, web-like network, with some cross-linking between chains. The insolubility of polyacetylene makes it difficult to characterize this material and to determine the extent of cross-linking in the material.

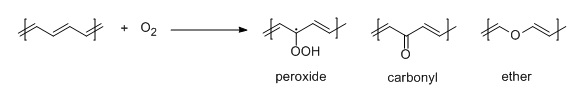
Products of oxidation of polyacetylene

For applications, polyacetylenes suffer from many drawbacks. They are insoluble in solvents, making it essentially impossible to process the material. While both cis and trans-polyacetylene show high thermal stability, exposure to air causes a large decrease in the flexibility and conductivity. When polyacetylene is exposed to air, oxidation of the backbone by O_{2} occurs. Infrared spectroscopy shows formation of carbonyl groups, epoxides, and peroxides. Coating with polyethylene or wax can slow the oxidation temporarily, while coating with glass increases stability indefinitely.

== Applications ==
Polyacetylene has no commercial applications, although the discovery of polyacetylene as a conductive organic polymer led to many developments in materials science. Conducting polymers are of interest for solution-processing for film-forming conductive polymers. Attention has shifted to other conductive polymers for application purposes including polythiophene and polyaniline. Molecular electronics could also be a potential application of conductive polyacetylene.

== See also ==
- Polyene
