= Kitaev chain =

Model for topological superconductors in physics

In condensed matter physics, the Kitaev chain or Kitaev–Majorana chain is a simplified model for a topological superconductor. It models a one dimensional lattice featuring Majorana bound states. The Kitaev chain has been used as a toy model of semiconductor nanowires for the development of topological quantum computers. The model was first proposed by Alexei Kitaev in 2000.

== Description ==
=== Hamiltonian ===
The tight binding Hamiltonian of a Kitaev chain considers a one dimensional lattice with N site and spinless particles at zero temperature, subjected to nearest neighbour hopping interactions, given in second quantization formalism as

$$H=-\mu\sum_{j=1}^N \left(c_j^\dagger c_j-\frac12\right)+\sum_{j=1}^{N-1}\left[-t\left(c_{j+1}^\dagger c_j+c_j^\dagger c_{j+1}\right)+|\Delta|\left(c_{j+1}^\dagger c_j^\dagger+c_j c_{j+1}\right)\right]$$

There$\mu$ is the chemical potential, $c_j^\dagger,c_j$ are creation and annihilation operators, $t\geq 0$ the energy needed for a particle to hop from one location of the lattice to another, $\Delta=|\Delta|e^{i\theta}$ is the induced superconducting gap (p-wave pairing) and $\theta$ is the coherent superconducting phase. This Hamiltonian has particle-hole symmetry, as well as time reversal symmetry.

The Hamiltonian can be rewritten using Majorana operators, given by

$$\left\{
\begin{matrix}
\gamma^{\rm A}_j=c_j^\dagger+c_j\\ \gamma^{\rm B}_j=i(c_j^\dagger-c_j)
\end{matrix}
\right.$$,

which can be thought as the real and imaginary parts of the annihilation operator $c_j=\tfrac{1}{2}(\gamma^{\rm A}_j+i\gamma^{\rm B}_j)$. These Majorana operators are Hermitian operators, and anticommutate,

$$\{\gamma^\alpha_j,\gamma^\beta_k\}=2 \delta_{jk}\delta_{\alpha \beta}$$.

Using these operators the Hamiltonian can be rewritten as

$$H=-\frac{i\mu}{2}\sum_{j=1}^N \gamma^{\rm B}_j \gamma^{\rm A}_j+\frac{i}{2}\sum_{j=1}^{N-1}\left(\omega_+\gamma^{\rm B}_j\gamma^{\rm A}_{j+1}+\omega_-\gamma^{\rm B}_{j+1}\gamma^{\rm A}_j\right)$$

where $\omega_\pm=|\Delta|\pm t$.

=== Trivial phase ===
In the limit $t=|\Delta|\to 0$, we obtain the following Hamiltonian

$$H=-\frac{i\mu}{2}\sum_{j=1}^N \gamma^{\rm B}_j \gamma^{\rm A}_j$$

where the Majorana operators are coupled on the same site. This condition is considered a topologically trivial phase.

=== Non-trivial phase ===
In the limit $\mu\to 0$ and $|\Delta|\to t$, we obtain the following Hamiltonian

$$H_{\rm M}=it\sum_{j=1}^{N-1}\gamma^{\rm B}_j\gamma^{\rm A}_{j+1}$$

where every Majorana operator is coupled to a Majorana operator of a different kind in the next site. By assigning a new fermion operator $\tilde{c}_j=\tfrac{1}{2}(\gamma^{\rm B}_j+i\gamma^{\rm A}_{j+1})$, the Hamiltonian is diagonalized, as

$$H_{\rm M}=2t\sum_{j=1}^{N-1}\left(\tilde{c}^\dagger_j \tilde{c}_j+\frac{1}{2}\right)$$

which describes a new set of N-1 Bogoliubov quasiparticles with energy t. The missing mode given by $\tilde{c}_{\rm M}=\tfrac{1}{2}(\gamma^{\rm B}_N+i\gamma^{\rm A}_{1})$ couples the Majorana operators from the two endpoints of the chain, as this mode does not appear in the Hamiltonian, it requires zero energy. This mode is called a Majorana zero mode and is highly delocalized. As the presence of this mode does not change the total energy, the ground state is two-fold degenerate. This condition is a topological superconducting non-trivial phase.

The existence of the Majorana zero mode is topologically protected from small perturbation due to symmetry considerations. For the Kitaev chain the Majorana zero mode persist as long as $\mu<2t$ and the superconducting gap is finite. The robustness of these modes makes it a candidate for qubits as a basis for topological quantum computer.

== Bulk case ==
Using Bogoliubov-de Gennes formalism it can be shown that for the bulk case (infinite number of sites), that the energy yields

$$E(k)=\pm\sqrt{(2t\cos k+\mu)^2+4|\Delta|^2\sin^2k}$$,

and it is gapped, except for the case $\mu=2t$ and wave vector $k=0$. For the bulk case there are no zero modes. However a topological invariant exists given by

$$Q=\mathrm{sign}\left\{\mathrm{pf}[iH(k=0)]\mathrm{pf}[iH(k=\pi)]\right\}$$,

where $\mathrm{pf}[x]$ is the Pfaffian operation. For $\mu>2t$, the invariant is strictly $Q=1$ and for $\mu<2t$, $Q=-1$ corresponding to the trivial and non-trivial phases from the finite chain, respectively. This relation between the topological invariant from the bulk case and the existence of Majorana zero modes in the finite case is called a bulk-edge correspondence.

== Experimental efforts ==
One possible realization of Kitaev chains is using semiconductor nanowires with strong spin–orbit interaction to break spin-degeneracy, like indium antimonide or indium arsenide. A magnetic field can be applied to induce Zeeman coupling to spin polarize the wire and break Kramers degeneracy. The superconducting gap can be induced using Andreev reflection, by putting the wire in the proximity to a superconductor. Realizations using 3D topological insulators have also been proposed.

There is no single definitive way to test for Majorana zero modes. One proposal to experimentally observe these modes is using scanning tunneling microscopy. A zero bias peak in the conductance could be the signature of a topological phase. Josephson effect between two wires in superconducting phase could also help to demonstrate these modes.

In 2023 QuTech team from Delft University of Technology reported the realization of a poor man's Majorana, a Kitaev chain with two or three sites that produces a Majorana bound state that is not topologically protected and therefore only stable for a very small range of parameters. It was obtained in a Kitaev chain consisting of two quantum dots in a superconducting nanowire strongly coupled by normal tunneling and Andreev tunneling with the state arising when the rate of both processes match. Some researches have raised concerns, suggesting that an alternative mechanism to that of Majorana bound states might explain the data obtained.

In 2024, the first experiment in an optomechanical network was conducted to create a bosonic analogue of a Kitaev chain.

== See also ==
- Su–Schrieffer–Heeger chain
