= Edge states =

Type of state in solid state physics

In solid state physics, edge states are the topologically protected electronic states that exist at the boundary of the material and cannot be removed without breaking the system's symmetry.

== Background ==
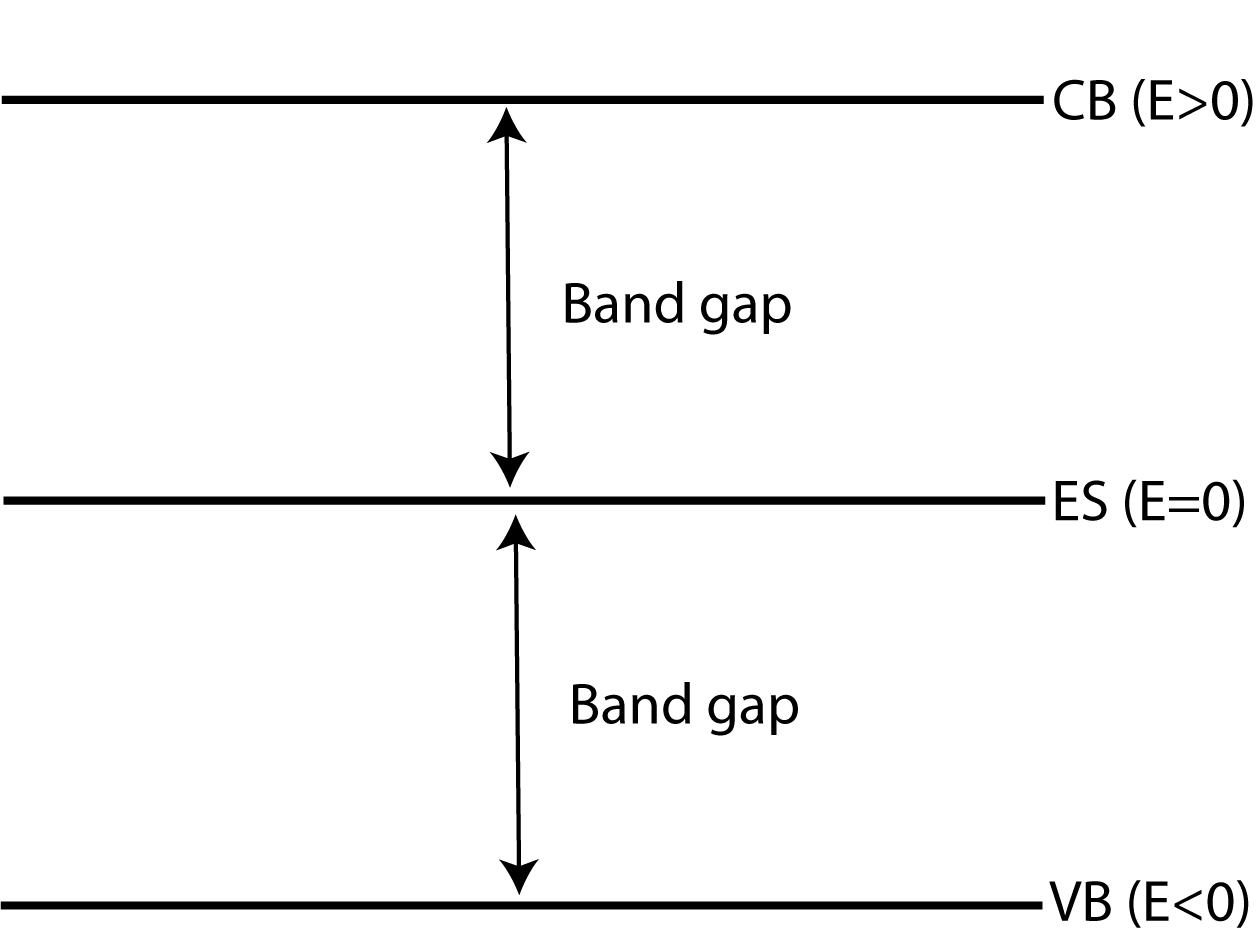
Schematic for illustration of edge states in typical two-dimensional material. The conduction band (CB), edge states (ES) and valence band (VB) are characterized by positive, zero and negative energy eigenvalues.

The electronic band structure of materials is primarily studied based on the extent of the band gap, the gap between highest occupied valence bands and lowest unoccupied conduction bands. The possible energy level of the material that provides the discrete energy values of all possible states in the energy profile diagram can be represented by solving the Hamiltonian of the system. This solution provides the corresponding energy eigenvalues and eigenvectors. Based on the energy eigenvalues, conduction band are the high energy states (energy E > 0) while valence bands are the low energy states (E < 0). In some materials, for example, in graphene and zigzag graphene quantum dot, there exists the energy states having energy eigenvalues exactly equal to zero (E = 0) besides the conduction and valence bands. These states are called edge states which modifies the electronic and optical properties of the materials significantly.
