= Stiffness =

Resistance to deformation in response to force

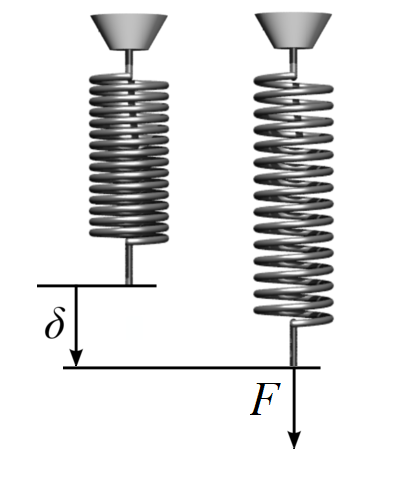
Extension of a coil spring, $\delta,$ caused by an axial force, $F.$

Stiffness or rigidity is the extent to which an object resists deformation in response to an applied force. The inverse of stiffness is flexibility or pliability: the more flexible an object is, the less stiff it is. Other terms with related meanings are compliance and elasticity.

== Calculations ==
The stiffness, $k,$ of a body is a measure of the resistance offered by an elastic body to deformation. For an elastic body with a single degree of freedom (DOF) (for example, stretching or compression of a rod), the stiffness is defined as
$$k = \frac {F}{\delta}$$
where,

- $F$ is the force on the body
- $\delta$ is the displacement produced by the force along the same degree of freedom (for instance, the change in length of a stretched spring)

Stiffness is usually defined under quasi-static conditions, but sometimes under dynamic loading.

In the International System of Units, stiffness is typically measured in newtons per meter ($\mathrm{N} / \mathrm{m}$). In Imperial units, stiffness is typically measured in pounds (lbs) per inch.

Generally speaking, deflections (or motions) of an infinitesimal element (which is viewed as a point) in an elastic body can occur along multiple DOF (maximum of six DOF at a point). For example, a point on a horizontal beam can undergo both a vertical displacement and a rotation relative to its undeformed axis. When there are $M$ degrees of freedom a $M \times M$ matrix must be used to describe the stiffness at the point. The diagonal terms in the matrix are the direct-related stiffnesses (or simply stiffnesses) along the same degree of freedom and the off-diagonal terms are the coupling stiffnesses between two different degrees of freedom (either at the same or different points) or the same degree of freedom at two different points. In industry, the term influence coefficient is sometimes used to refer to the coupling stiffness.

It is noted that for a body with multiple DOF, the equation above generally does not apply since the applied force generates not only the deflection along its direction (or degree of freedom) but also those along with other directions.

For a body with multiple DOF, to calculate a particular direct-related stiffness (the diagonal terms), the corresponding DOF is left free while the remaining should be constrained. Under such a condition, the above equation can obtain the direct-related stiffness for the degree of unconstrained freedom. The ratios between the reaction forces (or moments) and the produced deflection are the coupling stiffnesses.

The elasticity tensor is a generalization that describes all possible stretch and shear parameters.

A single spring may intentionally be designed to have variable (non-linear) stiffness throughout its displacement.

== Compliance ==
The inverse of stiffness is flexibility, elasticity or compliance, typically measured in units of metres per newton. In rheology, it may be defined as the ratio of strain to stress, and so take the units of reciprocal stress, for example, 1/Pa.

== Rotational stiffness ==
Twist, by angle $\alpha$ of a cylindrical bar, with length $L,$ caused by an axial moment, $M.$

A body may also have a rotational stiffness, $k,$ given by
$$k = \frac{M}{\theta}$$
where

- $M$ is the applied moment
- $\theta$ is the rotation angle

In the SI system, rotational stiffness is typically measured in newton-metres per radian.

In the SAE system, rotational stiffness is typically measured in inch-pounds per degree.

Further measures of stiffness are derived on a similar basis, including:

- shear stiffness - the ratio of applied shear force to shear deformation
- torsional stiffness - the ratio of applied torsion moment to the angle of twist

== Relationship to elasticity ==
The elastic modulus of a material is not the same as the stiffness of a component made from that material. Elastic modulus is a property of the constituent material; stiffness is a property of a structure or component of a structure, and hence it is dependent upon various physical dimensions that describe that component. That is, the modulus is an intensive property of the material; stiffness, on the other hand, is an extensive property of the solid body that is dependent on the material and its shape and boundary conditions. For example, for an element in tension or compression, the axial stiffness is
$$k = E \cdot \frac{A}{L}$$
where

- $E$ is the (tensile) elastic modulus (or Young's modulus),
- $A$ is the cross-sectional area,
- $L$ is the length of the element.

Similarly, the torsional stiffness of a straight section is
$$k = G \cdot \frac{J}{L}$$
where

- $G$ is the rigidity modulus of the material,
- $J$ is the torsion constant for the section.

The torsional stiffness has dimensions $\mathrm{[force]} \cdot \mathrm{[length]} / \mathrm{[angle]}$, so that its SI units are $\mathrm{N} \cdot \mathrm{m} / \mathrm{rad}$.

For the special case of unconstrained uniaxial tension or compression, Young's modulus can be thought of as a measure of the stiffness of a structure.

== Applications ==
The stiffness of a structure is of principal importance in many engineering applications, so the modulus of elasticity is often one of the primary properties considered when selecting a material. A high modulus of elasticity is sought when deflection is undesirable, while a low modulus of elasticity is required when flexibility is needed.

In biology, the stiffness of the extracellular matrix is important for guiding the migration of cells in a phenomenon called durotaxis.

Another application of stiffness finds itself in skin biology. The skin maintains its structure due to its intrinsic tension, contributed to by collagen, an extracellular protein that accounts for approximately 75% of its dry weight. The pliability of skin is a parameter of interest that represents its firmness and extensibility, encompassing characteristics such as elasticity, stiffness, and adherence. These factors are of functional significance to patients. This is of significance to patients with traumatic injuries to the skin, whereby the pliability can be reduced due to the formation and replacement of healthy skin tissue by a pathological scar. This can be evaluated both subjectively, or objectively using a device such as the Cutometer. The Cutometer applies a vacuum to the skin and measures the extent to which it can be vertically distended. These measurements are able to distinguish between healthy skin, normal scarring, and pathological scarring, and the method has been applied within clinical and industrial settings to monitor both pathophysiological sequelae, and the effects of treatments on skin.

== See also ==
- Bending stiffness – Continuum mechanics
- Compliant mechanism – Mechanism which transmits force through elastic body deformation
- Elasticity (physics) – Physical property when materials or objects return to original shape after deformation
- Elastic modulus – Physical property that measures stiffness of material
- Elastography – Set of imaging methods for determining soft-tissue hardness
- Hardness – Measure of a material's resistance to localized plastic deformation
- Hooke's law – Force needed to pull a spring grows linearly with distance
- Mechanical impedance – Relationship between harmonic force and velocity
- Moment of inertia – Scalar measure of the rotational inertia with respect to a fixed axis of rotation
- Shore durometer – Hardness-testing device
- Spring (device) – Elastic object that stores mechanical energy
- Stiffness (mathematics) – Differential equation exhibiting high rate of dissipation
- Stiffness tensor – Stress-strain relation in a linear elastic material
- Young's modulus – Mechanical property that measures stiffness of a solid material
