= Thermal shock =

Load caused by rapid temperature change

Thermal shock is a type of thermal stress caused by a sudden change in temperature. It is a common mode of failure when a hot meets cold, such as pouring boiling water in a cold glass, causing it to shatter. Large temperature differentials act as type of mechanical load, producing strain across the material. The load is caused by the different parts of the material expanding differently at their respective temperatures, resulting in internal strain. When the strain exceeds the tensile strength of the material, it causes mechanical failure of the material, resulting in fracture and potential structural failure.

== Effect on materials ==
Borosilicate glass is made to withstand thermal shock better than most other glass through a combination of reduced expansion coefficient, and greater strength, though fused quartz outperforms it in both these respects. Some glass-ceramic materials (mostly in the lithium aluminosilicate (LAS) system) include a controlled proportion of material with a negative expansion coefficient, so that the overall coefficient can be reduced to almost exactly zero over a reasonably wide range of temperatures.

Among the best thermomechanical materials, there are alumina, zirconia, tungsten alloys, silicon nitride, silicon carbide, boron carbide, and some stainless steels.

Reinforced carbon-carbon is extremely resistant to thermal shock, due to graphite's extremely high thermal conductivity and low expansion coefficient, the high strength of carbon fiber, and a reasonable ability to deflect cracks within the structure.

To measure thermal shock, the impulse excitation technique proved to be a useful tool. It can be used to measure Young's modulus, Shear modulus, Poisson's ratio, and damping coefficient in a non destructive way. The same test-piece can be measured after different thermal shock cycles, and this way the deterioration in physical properties can be mapped out.

== Prevention ==
Methods to prevent thermal shock include:

- Minimizing the thermal gradient by changing the temperature gradually
- Increasing the thermal conductivity of the material
- Reducing the coefficient of thermal expansion of the material
- Increasing the strength of the material
- Introducing compressive stress in the material, such as in tempered glass
- Decreasing the Young's modulus of the material
- Increasing the toughness of the material through crack tip blunting or crack deflection, utilizing the process of plastic deformation, and phase transformation

== Thermal shock resistance ==
The thermal shock resistance, $\Delta T_s$, is the maximal temperature difference at which a material can be quenched without sustaining damage.

=== Strength-controlled thermal shock resistance ===
Thermal shock resistance is used for material selection in applications subject to rapid temperature changes. The maximum temperature jump, $\Delta T$, sustainable by a material can be approximated for strength-controlled models by:
$$B\Delta T = \frac{\sigma_f}{\alpha E}$$
where $\sigma_f$ is the failure stress (which can be yield or fracture stress), $\alpha$ is the coefficient of thermal expansion, $E$ is the Young's modulus, and $B$ is a constant depending upon the part constraint, material properties, and thickness.

$$B = \frac{A}{C}$$
where $C$ is a system constrain constant dependent upon the Poisson's ratio, $\nu$, and $A$ is a non-dimensional parameter dependent upon the Biot number, $\mathrm{Bi}$.

$$C = \begin{cases}
1 & \text{axial stress} \\
(1-\nu) & \text{biaxial constraint} \\
(1-2\nu) & \text{triaxial constraint}
\end{cases}$$

$A$ may be approximated by:
$$A = \frac{Hh/k}{1 + Hh/k} = \frac{\mathrm{Bi}}{1 + \mathrm{Bi}}$$
where $H$ is the thickness, $h$ is the heat transfer coefficient, and $k$ is the thermal conductivity.

==== Perfect heat transfer ====
If perfect heat transfer ($\mathrm{Bi} = \infty$) is assumed, the maximum heat transfer supported by the material is:
$$\Delta T = A_1\frac{\sigma_f}{E\alpha}$$
where,

- $A_1 \approx 1$ for cold shock in plates
- $A_1 \approx 3.2$ for hot shock in plates

A material index for material selection according to thermal shock resistance in the fracture stress derived perfect heat transfer case is therefore:
$$\frac{\sigma_f}{E\alpha}$$

==== Poor heat transfer ====
For cases with poor heat transfer ($\mathrm{Bi} < 1$), the maximum heat differential supported by the material is:
$$\Delta T = A_2\frac{\sigma_f}{E\alpha}\frac{1}{\mathrm{Bi}} = A_2\frac{\sigma_f}{E\alpha}\frac{k}{hH}$$
where,

- $A_2 \approx 3.2$ for cold shock
- $A_2 \approx 6.5$ for hot shock

In the poor heat transfer case, a higher thermal conductivity is beneficial for thermal shock resistance. The material index for the poor heat transfer case is often taken as:
$$\frac{k\sigma_f}{E\alpha}$$
According to both the perfect and poor heat transfer models, larger temperature differentials can be tolerated for hot shock than for cold shock.

=== Fracture toughness controlled thermal shock resistance ===
In addition to thermal shock resistance defined by material fracture strength, models have also been defined within the fracture mechanics framework. Lu and Fleck produced criteria for thermal shock cracking based on fracture toughness controlled cracking. The models were based on thermal shock in ceramics (generally brittle materials). Assuming an infinite plate, and mode I cracking, the crack was predicted to start from the edge for cold shock, but the center of the plate for hot shock. Cases were divided into perfect, and poor heat transfer to further simplify the models.

==== Perfect heat transfer ====
The sustainable temperature jump decreases, with increasing convective heat transfer (and therefore larger Biot number). This is represented in the model shown below for perfect heat transfer ($\mathrm{Bi} = \infty$).

$$\Delta T = A_3 \frac{K_{Ic}}{E \alpha \sqrt {\pi H}}$$
where $K_{Ic}$ is the mode I fracture toughness, $E$ is the Young's modulus, $\alpha$ is the thermal expansion coefficient, and $H$ is half the thickness of the plate.

- $A_3 \approx 4.5$ for cold shock
- $A_4 \approx 5.6$ for hot shock

A material index for material selection in the fracture mechanics derived perfect heat transfer case is therefore:
$$\frac{K_{Ic}}{E\alpha}$$

==== Poor heat transfer ====
For cases with poor heat transfer, the Biot number is an important factor in the sustainable temperature jump.

$$\Delta T = A_4 \frac{K_{Ic}}{E \alpha \sqrt{\pi H}}\frac{k}{hH}$$

Critically, for poor heat transfer cases, materials with higher thermal conductivity, k, have higher thermal shock resistance. As a result, a commonly chosen material index for thermal shock resistance in the poor heat transfer case is:
$$\frac{kK_{Ic}}{E\alpha}$$

=== Kingery thermal shock methods ===
The temperature difference to initiate fracture has been described by William David Kingery to be:
$$\Delta T_c = S \frac{k\sigma^*(1-\nu)}{E\alpha} \frac{1}{h} = \frac{S}{hR^'}$$
where $S$ is a shape factor, $\sigma^*$ is the fracture stress, $k$ is the thermal conductivity, $E$ is the Young's modulus, $\alpha$ is the coefficient of thermal expansion, $h$ is the heat transfer coefficient, and $R'$ is a fracture resistance parameter. The fracture resistance parameter is a common metric used to define the thermal shock tolerance of materials.

$$R' = \frac{k\sigma^*(1-v)}{E\alpha}$$

The formulas were derived for ceramic materials, and make the assumptions of a homogeneous body with material properties independent of temperature, but can be well applied to other brittle materials.

== Testing ==
Thermal shock testing exposes products to alternating low and high temperatures to accelerate failures caused by temperature cycles or thermal shocks during normal use. The transition between temperature extremes occurs very rapidly, greater than 15 °C per minute.

Equipment with single or multiple chambers is typically used to perform thermal shock testing. When using single chamber thermal shock equipment, the products remain in one chamber and the chamber air temperature is rapidly cooled and heated. Some equipment uses separate hot and cold chambers with an elevator mechanism that transports the products between two or more chambers.

Glass containers can be sensitive to sudden changes in temperature. One method of testing involves rapid movement from cold to hot water baths, and back.

== Examples of thermal shock failure ==
- Hard rocks containing ore veins such as quartzite were formerly broken down using fire-setting, which involved heating the rock face with a wood fire, then quenching with water to induce crack growth. It is described by Diodorus Siculus in Egyptian gold mines, Pliny the Elder, and Georg Agricola.
- Ice cubes placed in a glass of warm water crack by thermal shock as the exterior surface increases in temperature much faster than the interior. The outer layer expands as it warms, while the interior remains largely unchanged. This rapid change in volume between different layers creates stresses in the ice that build until the force exceeds the strength of the ice, and a crack forms, sometimes with enough force to shoot ice shards out of the container.
- Incandescent bulbs that have been running for a while have a very hot surface. Splashing cold water on them can cause the glass to shatter due to thermal shock, and the bulb to implode.
- An antique cast iron cookstove is a simple iron box on legs, with a cast iron top. A wood or coal fire is built inside the box and food is cooked on the top outer surface of the box, like a griddle. If a fire is built too hot, and then the stove is cooled by pouring water on the top surface, it will crack due to thermal shock.
- The strong gradient of temperature (due to the dousing of a fire with water) is believed to have caused the breakage of the third Tsar Bell.
- Thermal shock is a primary contributor to head gasket failure in internal combustion engines.

== See also ==
- Biot number
- Impulse excitation technique
- Spontaneous glass breakage
- Strain
- Thermal pollution
