= Lamé parameters =

Material property in strain-stress relationship

In continuum mechanics, Lamé parameters (also called the Lamé coefficients, Lamé constants or Lamé moduli) are two material-dependent quantities denoted by λ and μ that arise in strain-stress relationships. In general, λ and μ are individually referred to as Lamé's first parameter and Lamé's second parameter, respectively. Other names are sometimes employed for one or both parameters, depending on context. For example, the parameter μ is referred to in fluid dynamics as the dynamic viscosity of a fluid (not expressed in the same units); whereas in the context of elasticity, μ is called the shear modulus, and is sometimes denoted by G instead of μ. Typically the notation G is seen paired with the use of Young's modulus E, and the notation μ is paired with the use of λ.

In homogeneous and isotropic materials, these define Hooke's law in 3D,
$$\boldsymbol{\sigma} = 2\mu \boldsymbol{\varepsilon} + \lambda \operatorname{tr}(\boldsymbol{\varepsilon}) I,$$
where σ is the stress tensor, ε the strain tensor, I the identity matrix, and tr the trace function. Hooke's law may be written in terms of tensor components using index notation as
$$\sigma_{ij} = 2 \mu \varepsilon_{ij} + \lambda \delta_{ij} \varepsilon_{kk},$$
where δ_{ij} is the Kronecker delta.

The two parameters together constitute a parameterization of the elastic moduli for homogeneous isotropic media, popular in mathematical literature, and are thus related to the other elastic moduli; for instance, the bulk modulus can be expressed as K = λ + 2/3μ. Relations for other moduli are found in the (λ, G) row of the conversions table at the end of this article.

Although the shear modulus, μ, must be positive, the Lamé's first parameter, λ, can be negative, in principle; however, for most materials it is also positive.

These two parameters are equal for isotropic materials that can be modeled as being made of constituents that interact only through central forces, so their elasticity can be parameterized by just a single constant. This simplifies calculations. Such materials are called Poisson solids or less frequently Cauchy solids. Many crystalline materials, ceramics, glass, rocks, and semiconductors come close to this ideal.

The parameters are named after Gabriel Lamé. They have the same dimension as stress and are usually given in the SI unit of stress, the pascal.

== See also ==
- Elasticity tensor

Homogeneous isotropic linear elastic materials have their elastic properties uniquely determined by any two quantities among these; thus, given any two, any other of the elastic moduli can be calculated according to these formulas, provided both for 3D materials (first part of the table) and for 2D materials (second part).
3D Formulae
Knowns	Bulk modulus (K)	Young's modulus (E)	Lamé's first parameter (λ)	Shear modulus (G)	Poisson's ratio (ν)	P-wave modulus (M)	Notes
(K, E)			3K(1 + 6K/(E − 9K))	E/(3 − E/3K)	1/2 − E/6K	(3K + E)/(3 − E/3K)	
(K, λ)		(9K(K − λ))/(3K − λ)		(3(K − λ))/2	λ/(3K − λ)	3K − 2λ	
(K, G)		9KG/(3K + G)	K − 2G/3		(3K − 2G)/(6K + 2G)	K + 4G/3	
(K, ν)		3K(1 − 2ν)	3Kν/(1 + ν)	(3K(1 − 2ν))/(2(1 + ν))		(3K(1 − ν))/(1 + ν)	
(K, M)		(9K(M − K))/(3K + M)	(3K − M)/2	(3(M − K))/4	(3K − M)/(3K + M)		
(E, λ)	(E + 3λ + R)/6			(E − 3λ + R)/4	− (E + R)/4λ − 1/4	(E − λ + R)/2	R = ±(E^{2} + 9λ^{2} + 2Eλ)^{1/2}
(E, G)	EG/(3(3G − E))		(G(E − 2G))/(3G − E)		E/2G − 1	(G(4G − E))/(3G − E)	
(E, ν)	E/(3 − 6ν)		Eν/((1 + ν)(1 − 2ν))	E/(2(1 + ν))		(E(1 − ν))/((1 + ν)(1 − 2ν))	
(E, M)	(3M − E + S)/6		(M − E + S)/4	(3M + E − S)/8	(E + S)/4M − 1/4		S = ±(E^{2} + 9M^{2} − 10EM)^{1/2}
(λ, G)	λ + 2G/3	(G(3λ + 2G))/(λ + G)			λ/(2(λ + G))	λ + 2G	
(λ, ν)	λ/3(1 + 1/ν)	λ(1/ν − 2ν − 1)		λ(1/2ν − 1)		λ(1/ν − 1)	
(λ, M)	(M + 2λ)/3	((M − λ)(M+2λ))/(M + λ)		(M − λ)/2	λ/(M + λ)		
(G, ν)	(2G(1 + ν))/(3 − 6ν)	2G(1 + ν)	(2 G ν)/(1 − 2ν)			(2G(1 − ν))/(1 − 2ν)	
(G, M)	M − 4G/3	(G(3M − 4G))/(M − G)	M − 2G		(M − 2G)/(2M − 2G)		
(ν, M)	(M(1 + ν))/(3(1 − ν))	(M(1 + ν)(1 − 2ν))/(1 − ν)	(M ν)/(1 − ν)	(M(1 − 2ν))/(2(1 − ν))			
2D Formulae
Knowns	(K)	(E)	(λ)	(G)	(ν)	(M)	Notes
(K_{2D}, E_{2D})			(2K_{2D}(2K_{2D} − E_{2D}))/(4K_{2D} − E_{2D})	K_{2D}E_{2D}/(4K_{2D} − E_{2D})	(2K_{2D} − E_{2D})/2K_{2D}	4K_{2D}^2/(4K_{2D} − E_{2D})	
(K_{2D}, λ_{2D})		(4K_{2D}(K_{2D} − λ_{2D}))/(2K_{2D} − λ_{2D})		K_{2D} − λ_{2D}	λ_{2D}/(2K_{2D} − λ_{2D})	2K_{2D} − λ_{2D}	
(K_{2D}, G_{2D})		4K_{2D}G_{2D}/(K_{2D} + G_{2D})	K_{2D} − G_{2D}		(K_{2D} − G_{2D})/(K_{2D} + G_{2D})	K_{2D} + G_{2D}	
(K_{2D}, ν_{2D})		2K_{2D}(1 − ν_{2D})	2K_{2D}ν_{2D}/(1 + ν_{2D})	(K_{2D}(1 − ν_{2D}))/(1 + ν_{2D})		2K_{2D}/(1 + ν_{2D})	
(E_{2D}, G_{2D})	E_{2D}G_{2D}/(4G_{2D} − E_{2D})		(2G_{2D}(E_{2D} − 2G_{2D}))/(4G_{2D} − E_{2D})		E_{2D}/2G_{2D} − 1	4G_{2D}^2/(4G_{2D} − E_{2D})	
(E_{2D}, ν_{2D})	E_{2D}/(2(1 − ν_{2D}))		E_{2D}ν_{2D}/((1 + ν_{2D})(1 − ν_{2D}))	E_{2D}/(2(1 + ν_{2D}))		E_{2D}/((1 + ν_{2D})(1 − ν_{2D}))	
(λ_{2D}, G_{2D})	λ_{2D} + G_{2D}	(4G_{2D}(λ_{2D} + G_{2D}))/(λ_{2D} + 2G_{2D})			λ_{2D}/(λ_{2D} + 2G_{2D})	λ_{2D} + 2G_{2D}	
(λ_{2D}, ν_{2D})	(λ_{2D}(1 + ν_{2D}))/2ν_{2D}	(λ_{2D}(1 + ν_{2D})(1 − ν_{2D}))/ν_{2D}		(λ_{2D}(1 − ν_{2D}))/2ν_{2D}		λ_{2D}/ν_{2D}	
(G_{2D}, ν_{2D})	(G_{2D}(1 + ν_{2D}))/(1 − ν_{2D})	2G_{2D}(1 + ν_{2D})	(2 G_{2D} ν_{2D})/(1 − ν_{2D})			2G_{2D}/(1 − ν_{2D})	
(G_{2D}, M_{2D})	M_{2D} − G_{2D}	(4G_{2D}(M_{2D} − G_{2D}))/M_{2D}	M_{2D} − 2G_{2D}		(M_{2D} − 2G_{2D})/M_{2D}		
