= Refractories heat-up =

After building of a new refractory-lined industrial furnace or equipment, or refractory maintenance or relining of existing equipment, a necessary step is the start-up of the operation, which usually involves heating-up the unit in a controllable way, in order to prevent spalling or shortening of the materials' predicted lifetime.

== Refractory castable and water removal ==
The most well-known problem that can be avoided with proper heat-up is the dry-out spalling, which is often the result of excessive pressurization of entrapped steam after heating above the ebullition point of water. Similarly to the Portland concrete used in civil engineering, water is added to the refractory castables to provide workability and allow molding, pumping, shotcreting or other forms of placement. Water exists within castables in free or combined forms: while free water remains in the pores without reaction with the materials' other constituents, combined water is present usually in the hydrated compounds of cement. As a result, the energy needed for their removal is different and, while free water leaves for the atmosphere at higher rates from about 100 degrees Celsius, temperatures at the range of 150 to 300 degrees Celsius may be necessary to remove the combined water. Because of the technological trend to reduce alkali content from the majority of refractories, the amount of combined water present in the moment of heat-up was reduced in the last years. On the other hand, recent developments which led to increases in mechanical strength, thermal shock resistance, erosion resistance, etc., also led to a reduction in permeability. Such permeability reduction caused an increase in vapor entrapment, which can lead to explosive spalling.

Understanding the effects of different heating rates on green concrete structures is of primary importance to engineers and industry, particularly to avoid the occurrence of an explosive spalling event. If an explosive spalling occurs, projectiles of reasonable mass (1–10 kg) can be thrust violently over many metres, having safety implication and rendering the refractory structure unfit for service. Repairs will then be required resulting in significant costs to industry.

=== Microstructural engineering to avoid explosive spalling ===
Several efforts can be carried out to increase the materials' ability to withstand a more aggressive dry-out. They involve incorporating low melting point fibers, such as polypropylene, or oxidizing metallic powders (e.g. aluminium powder) to provide permeable paths to deliver the vapor to the atmosphere, thereby relieving the internal pressure. Another option is to mechanically reinforce the microstructure so the material can dissipate enough energy with the beginning of crack growth, avoiding explosion.

== Thermal shock ==
When the material goes from a thermal configuration to another one, the resulting transient temperature fields will lead to variation in the thermal expansion condition at adjacent places. Therefore, thermal stresses may result in thermal shock crack propagation, which can shorten the lifetime expectancy for the material.

== Heat-up methods ==
The technology chosen to heat-up a given equipment should account for the following features:

- Thermal stability of the heat source
- Thermal homogeneity within all the equipment
- Safety of operation
- Reproducibility

The most used method is based on the convective heat transfer.
