= Tangent modulus =

Slope of the stress-strain curve in solid mechanics

In solid mechanics, the tangent modulus is the slope of the stress–strain curve at any specified stress or strain. Below the proportional limit (the limit of the linear elastic regime) the tangent modulus is equivalent to Young's modulus. Above the proportional limit the tangent modulus varies with strain and is most accurately found from test data. The Ramberg–Osgood equation relates Young's modulus to the tangent modulus and is another method for obtaining the tangent modulus.

The tangent modulus is useful in describing the behavior of materials that have been stressed beyond the elastic region. When a material is plastically deformed there is no longer a linear relationship between stress and strain as there is for elastic deformations. The tangent modulus quantifies the "softening" or "hardening" of material that generally occurs when it begins to yield.

Although the material softens it is still generally able to sustain more load before ultimate failure. Therefore, more weight efficient structure can be designed when plastic behavior is considered. For example, a structural analyst may use the tangent modulus to quantify the buckling failure of columns and flat plates.

== See also ==
- Young's modulus
- Elasticity
- ASTM
