= Quasistatic =

Quasistatic can refer to:

- Quasistatic process
- Quasistatic equilibrium
- Quasistatic loading
- Quasistatic approximation
