= Iridium trihydride =

Names
- IUPAC name Iridium(III) hydride

Identifiers
3D model (JSmol)	Interactive image
ChemSpider	24772384
PubChem CID	12055421
- InChI: InChI=1S/Ir.3H Key: DBPBAPSFGLNQOX-UHFFFAOYSA-N
- SMILES: [IrH3]

Properties
Chemical formula	H_{3}Ir
Molar mass	195.241 g·mol^{−1}
- Except where otherwise noted, data are given for materials in their standard state (at 25 °C [77 °F], 100 kPa). Infobox references

Iridium trihydride (IrH_{3}) is a chemical compound of iridium and hydrogen that can be formed under high pressure. The crystalline form has a distorted simple cubic structure. The hydrogen atoms are on the centre of the faces of the crystal cell cube, and Iridium is at the centre. It forms at over 55 GPa.

The bulk modulus of iridium trihydride is 190 GPa which is much less than that of iridium (383 GPa).

Decomposition of iridium trihydride is slow when the pressure is reduced to 6 GPa, and perhaps it can be metastable at atmospheric pressures.

A dihydride, IrH_{2}, is predicted to be stable over 14 GPa.
