= Stress wave tomography =

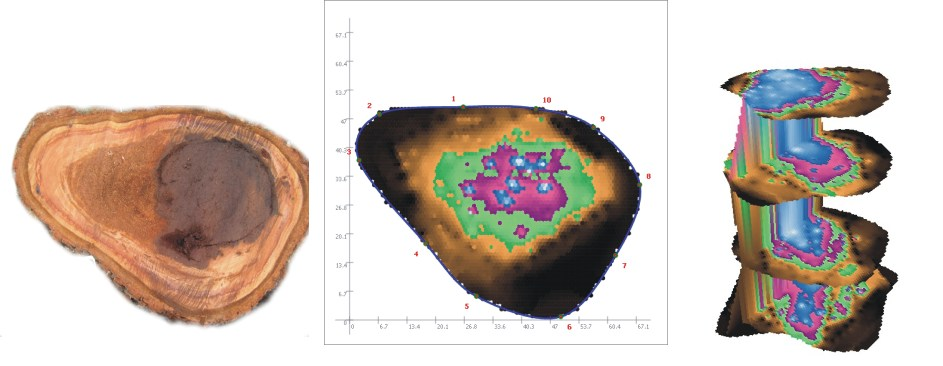
Photo and stress wave tomogram of a eucalyptus tree with some rot. Healthy wood is shown in brown colors. Right: The 3D visualization shows the vertical extent of the rot.

Acoustic or stress wave tomography is a non-destructive measurement method for the visualization of the structural integrity of a solid object. It is being used to test the preservation of wood or concrete, for example. The term acoustic tomography refers to the perceptible sounds that are caused by the mechanical impulses used for measuring. The term stress wave tomography describes the measurement method more accurately.

== Features ==
The method is based on multiple measurements of the time of flight of stress waves between sensors which are connected to a two- or three-dimensional sampling grid. In the acoustic stress wave tomography of trees (see also: tree diagnosis), concussion sensors are attached in one or several planes around a trunk or a branch and their positions are measured. Impulses are induced through strokes of a hammer and the arrival times at the sensors are recorded.

The propagation speed of impulses in solid objects correlates with the density and the elastic modulus of the material (see also: speed of sound). Internal damage, like rot or cracks, slows down the impulses or forms barriers that render transmission of impulses more difficult. This leads to longer propagation times and gets interpreted as reduced speed. Apparent velocity of sound is calculated by dividing the smallest distance between sensors by the time of flight between them.

Special mathematical algorithms turn the matrix of velocities into a color or greyscale image (tomogram) which enables an assessment of the extent of damage. The precision of the method is limited by the number of sensors used. Image resolution is inferior to X-ray computed tomography due to the longer wavelength of the signals, but avoids issues with high energy radiation.

Devices of this kind are the Arbotom, the PiCUS acoustic tomograph and the Arborsonic 3D.

== Literature ==
- Tomikawa, Y., Iwase, Y., Arita, K., and Yamada, H., 1986. Nondestructive Inspection of a Wooden Pole Using Ultrasonic Computed Tomography. IEEE Transactions on Ultrasonics, Ferroelectrics and Frequency Control, 33 (4), 354–358.
- Turpening, R.M., Zhu, Z., Matarese, J.R., and Lewis, C.E., 1999. Acoustic tree and wooden member imaging apparatus. Patent WO 99/44050 (1999.02.27)
- Rinn, F. (1999): Vorrichtung zur Materialuntersuchung. / Device for investigation materials. International Patent PCT/DE00/01467 (1999.05.11).
- Rust S.; Göcke, L. (2000): A new tomographic device for the non-destructive testing of standing trees. In: Proceedings of the 12th International Symposium on Nondestructive Testing of Wood. University of Western Hungary, Sopron, 13–15 September 2000, 233–238.
- Rust, S. (2001): Baumdiagnose ohne Bohren. AFZ – Der Wald 56: 924–925.
- Rinn, F. (2003): Technische Grundlagen der Impuls-Tomographie, Baumzeitung (8): 29–31.
- Rabe, C., Ferner, D., Fink, S., Schwarze, F. (2004): Detection of decay in trees with stress waves and interpretation of acoustic tomograms. Arborcultural Journal 28 (1/2): 3–19
- Haaben, C., Sander, C., Hapla, F., 2006: Untersuchung der Stammqualität verschiedener Laubholzarten mittels Schallimpuls-Tomographie. Holztechnologie 47 (6): 2–5
