= Young's modulus =

Mechanical property that measures stiffness of a solid material

- The slope of the linear part of the stress–strain curve for a material under tension or compression
- Common symbols: E
- SI unit: Pa
- Intensive?: yes
- Derivations from other quantities: G = σ / ε
- Dimension: $\mathsf{L}^{-1} \mathsf{M} \mathsf{T}^{-2}$

Young's modulus (or the Young modulus) is a mechanical property of solid materials that measures the tensile or compressive stiffness when the force is applied lengthwise. It is the elastic modulus for tension or axial compression. Young's modulus is defined as the quotient of the stress (force per unit area) applied to the object and the resulting axial strain (a dimensionless quantity that quantifies relative deformation) in the linear elastic region of the material. As such, Young's modulus is similar and proportional to the spring constant in Hooke's law, but with dimensions of pressure instead of force per distance.

Although Young's modulus is named after the 19th-century British scientist Thomas Young, the concept was developed in 1727 by Leonhard Euler. The first experiments that used the concept of Young's modulus in its modern form were performed by the Italian scientist Giordano Riccati in 1782, pre-dating Young's work by 25 years. The term modulus is derived from the Latin root term modus, which means measure.

== Definition ==
Young's modulus, $E$, quantifies the relationship between tensile or compressive stress $\sigma$ (force per unit area) and axial strain $\varepsilon$ (proportional deformation) in the linear elastic region of a material:
$$E = \frac{\sigma}{\varepsilon}$$
Young's modulus is commonly measured in the International System of Units (SI) in multiples of the pascal (Pa) and common values are in the range of gigapascals (GPa).

Examples:

- Rubber (increasing pressure: large length increase, meaning low $E$)
- Aluminium (increasing pressure: small length increase, meaning high $E$)

=== Linear elasticity ===
A solid material undergoes elastic deformation when a small load is applied to it in compression or extension. Elastic deformation is reversible, meaning that the material returns to its original shape after the load is removed.

At near-zero stress and strain, the stress–strain curve is linear, and the relationship between stress and strain is described by Hooke's law that states stress is proportional to strain. The coefficient of proportionality is Young's modulus. The higher the modulus, the more stress is needed to create the same amount of strain; an idealized rigid body would have an infinite Young's modulus. Conversely, a very soft material (such as a fluid) would deform without force, and would have zero Young's modulus.

=== Related but distinct properties ===
Material stiffness is a distinct property from the following:

- Strength: maximum amount of stress that material can withstand while staying in the elastic (reversible) deformation regime;
- Geometric stiffness: a global characteristic of the body that depends on its shape, and not only on the local properties of the material; for instance, an I-beam has a higher bending stiffness than a rod of the same material for a given mass per length;
- Hardness: relative resistance of the material's surface to penetration by a harder body;
- Toughness: amount of energy that a material can absorb before fracture.
- The point E is the elastic limit or the yield point of the material within which the stress is proportional to strain and the material regains its original shape after removal of the external force.

== Usage ==
Young's modulus enables the calculation of the change in the dimension of a bar made of an isotropic elastic material under tensile or compressive loads. For instance, it predicts how much a material sample extends under tension or shortens under compression. The Young's modulus directly applies to cases of uniaxial stress; that is, tensile or compressive stress in one direction and no stress in the other directions. Young's modulus is also used in order to predict the deflection that will occur in a statically determinate beam when a load is applied at a point in between the beam's supports.

Other elastic calculations usually require the use of one additional elastic property, such as the shear modulus $G$, bulk modulus $K$, and Poisson's ratio $\nu$. Any two of these parameters are sufficient to fully describe elasticity in an isotropic material. For example, calculating physical properties of cancerous skin tissue, has been measured and found to be a Poisson's ratio of 0.43±0.12 and an average Young's modulus of 52 KPa. Defining the elastic properties of skin may become the first step in turning elasticity into a clinical tool. For homogeneous isotropic materials simple relations exist between elastic constants that allow calculating them all as long as two are known:
$$\begin{align}
E &= G(2+2\nu) &&= K(3-6\nu) &&= \frac{9KG}{3K+G}\\
G &= \frac{E}{2+2\nu} &&= \frac{K(3-6\nu)}{2+2\nu} &&= \frac{E}{3-\frac{E}{3K}}\\
K &= \frac{G(2+2\nu)}{3-6\nu} &&= \frac{E}{3-6\nu} &&= \frac{EG}{9G-3E}\\
\nu &= \frac{E}{2G}-1 &&= \frac{1}{2} - \frac{E}{6K} &&= \frac{3K-2G}{2(3K+G)}\\
\end{align}$$

=== Linear versus non-linear ===
Young's modulus represents the factor of proportionality in Hooke's law, which relates the stress and the strain. However, Hooke's law is only valid under the assumption of an elastic and linear response. Any real material will eventually fail and break when stretched over a very large distance or with a very large force; however, all solid materials exhibit nearly Hookean behavior for small enough strains or stresses. If the range over which Hooke's law is valid is large enough compared to the typical stress that one expects to apply to the material, the material is said to be linear. Otherwise (if the typical stress one would apply is outside the linear range), the material is said to be non-linear.

Steel, carbon fiber and glass among others are usually considered linear materials, while other materials such as rubber and soils are non-linear. However, this is not an absolute classification: if very small stresses or strains are applied to a non-linear material, the response will be linear, but if very high stress or strain is applied to a linear material, the linear theory will not be enough. For example, as the linear theory implies reversibility, it would be absurd to use the linear theory to describe the failure of a steel bridge under a high load; although steel is a linear material for most applications, it is not in such a case of catastrophic failure.

In solid mechanics, the slope of the stress–strain curve at any point is called the tangent modulus. It can be experimentally determined from the slope of a stress–strain curve created during tensile tests conducted on a sample of the material.

=== Directional materials ===
Young's modulus is not always the same in all orientations of a material. Most metals and ceramics, along with many other materials, are isotropic, and their mechanical properties are the same in all orientations. However, metals and ceramics can be treated with certain impurities, and metals can be mechanically worked to make their grain structures directional. These materials then become anisotropic, and Young's modulus will change depending on the direction of the force vector. Anisotropy can be seen in many composites as well. For example, carbon fiber has a much higher Young's modulus (is much stiffer) when force is loaded parallel to the fibers (along the grain). Other such materials include wood and reinforced concrete. Engineers can use this directional phenomenon to their advantage in creating structures.

=== Temperature dependence ===
The Young's modulus of metals varies with the temperature and can be realized through the change in the interatomic bonding of the atoms, and hence its change is found to be dependent on the change in the work function of the metal. Although classically, this change is predicted through fitting and without a clear underlying mechanism (for example, the Watchman's formula), the Rahemi-Li model demonstrates how the change in the electron work function leads to change in the Young's modulus of metals and predicts this variation with calculable parameters, using the generalization of the Lennard-Jones potential to solids. In general, as the temperature increases, the Young's modulus decreases via $E(T) = \beta(\varphi(T))^6$ where the electron work function varies with the temperature as $\varphi(T)=\varphi_0-\gamma\frac{(k_BT)^2}{\varphi_0}$ and $\gamma$ is a calculable material property which is dependent on the crystal structure (for example, BCC, FCC). $\varphi_0$ is the electron work function at T=0 and $\beta$ is constant throughout the change. Additionally, the Rahemi–Li model links the temperature dependence of Young’s modulus in metals to changes in the electron work function, providing a theoretical basis using a generalized Lennard-Jones potential.

== Calculation ==
Young's modulus is calculated by dividing the tensile stress, $\sigma(\varepsilon)$, by the engineering extensional strain, $\varepsilon$, in the elastic (initial, linear) portion of the physical stress–strain curve:

$$E \equiv \frac{\sigma(\varepsilon)}{\varepsilon}= \frac{F/A}{\Delta L/L_0} = \frac{F L_0} {A \, \Delta L}$$
where

- $E$ is the Young's modulus (modulus of elasticity);
- $F$ is the force exerted on an object under tension;
- $A$ is the actual cross-sectional area, which equals the area of the cross-section perpendicular to the applied force;
- $\Delta L$ is the amount by which the length of the object changes ($\Delta L$ is positive if the material is stretched, and negative when the material is compressed);
- $L_0$ is the original length of the object.

An equivalent definition of Young's modulus is
$$E = \frac{L_0} {A} \left. \frac{d^2 U}{dL^2} \right|_{L_0}$$
where $U$ is material's energy.

=== Force exerted by stretched or contracted material ===
Young's modulus of a material can be used to calculate the force it exerts under specific strain.

$$F = \frac{E A \, \Delta L} {L_0}$$

where $F$ is the force exerted by the material when contracted or stretched by $\Delta L$.

Hooke's law for a stretched wire can be derived from this formula:

$$F = \left( \frac{E A} {L_0} \right) \, \Delta L = k x$$

where it comes in saturation

$k \equiv \frac {E A} {L_0} \,$ and $x \equiv \Delta L.$

Note that the elasticity of coiled springs comes from shear modulus, not Young's modulus. When a spring is stretched, its wire's length doesn't change, but its shape does. This is why only the shear modulus of elasticity is involved in the stretching of a spring.

=== Elastic potential energy ===
The elastic potential energy stored in a linear elastic material is given by the integral of the Hooke's law:

$$U_e = \int {k x}\, dx = \frac {1} {2} k x^2.$$

now by explicating the intensive variables:

$$U_e = \int \frac{E A \, \Delta L} {L_0}\, d\Delta L = \frac {E A} {L_0} \int \Delta L \, d\Delta L = \frac {E A \, {\Delta L}^2} {2 L_0}$$

This means that the elastic potential energy density (that is, per unit volume) is given by:

$$\frac{U_e} {A L_0} = \frac {E \, {\Delta L}^2} {2 L_0^2} =\frac{1}{2} \times \frac {E\, {\Delta L}}{L_0} \times \frac {\Delta L}{L_0} = \frac {1}{2} \times \sigma(\varepsilon) \times \varepsilon$$

or, in simple notation, for a linear elastic material: $u_e(\varepsilon) = \int {E \, \varepsilon}\, d\varepsilon = \frac {1} {2} E {\varepsilon}^2$, since the strain is defined $\varepsilon \equiv \frac {\Delta L} {L_0}$.

In a nonlinear elastic material the Young's modulus is a function of the strain, so the second equivalence no longer holds, and the elastic energy is not a quadratic function of the strain:

$$u_e(\varepsilon) = \int E(\varepsilon) \, \varepsilon \, d\varepsilon \ne \frac {1} {2} E \varepsilon^2$$

== Examples ==
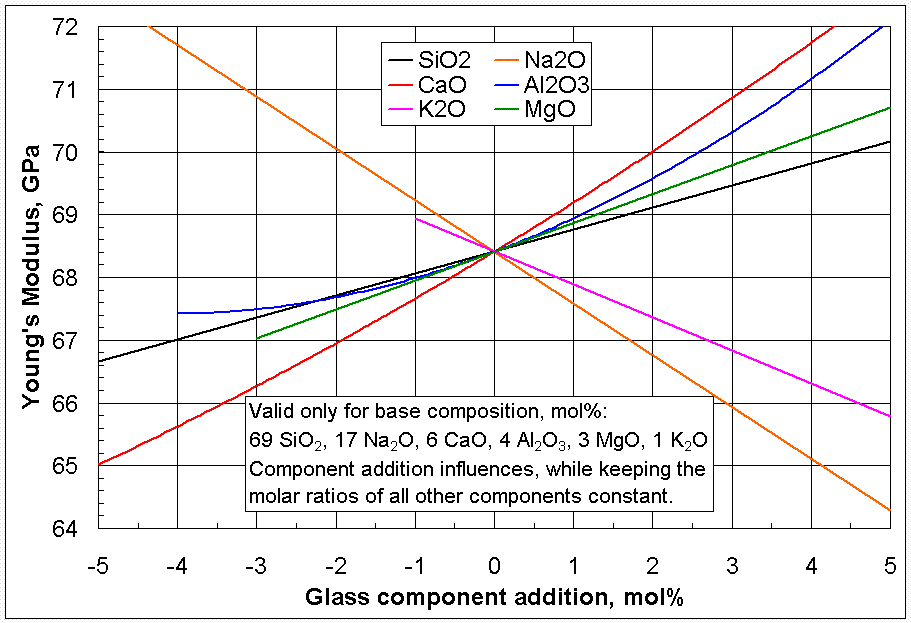
Influences of selected glass component additions on Young's modulus of a specific base glass

Young's modulus can vary somewhat due to differences in sample composition and test method. The rate of deformation has the greatest impact on the data collected, especially in polymers. The values here are approximate and only meant for relative comparison.

Approximate Young's modulus for various materials
Material	Young's modulus		Ref.
Material	GPa	psi	Ref.
Aluminium (_{13}Al)	68	9.9×10^{6}	
Amino-acid molecular crystals	21–44	3.0×10^{6}–6.4×10^{6}	
Aramid (for example, Kevlar)	70.5–112.4	10.23×10^{6}–16.30×10^{6}	
Aromatic peptide-nanospheres	230–275	33.4×10^{6}–39.9×10^{6}	
Aromatic peptide-nanotubes	19–27	2.8×10^{6}–3.9×10^{6}	
Bacteriophage capsids	1–3	0.15×10^{6}–0.44×10^{6}	
Beryllium (_{4}Be)	287	41.6×10^{6}	
Bone, human cortical	14	2.0×10^{6}	
Brass	106	15.4×10^{6}	
Bronze	112	16.2×10^{6}	
Carbon nitride (CN_{2})	822	119.2×10^{6}	
Carbon-fiber-reinforced plastic (CFRP), 50/50 fibre/matrix, biaxial fabric	30–50	4.4×10^{6}–7.3×10^{6}	
Carbon-fiber-reinforced plastic (CFRP), 70/30 fibre/matrix, unidirectional, along fibre	181	26.3×10^{6}	
Cobalt-chrome (CoCr)	230	33×10^{6}	
Copper (Cu), annealed	110	16×10^{6}	
Diamond (C), synthetic	1,050–1,210	152×10^{6}–175×10^{6}	
Diatom frustules, largely silicic acid	0.35–2.77	0.051×10^{6}–0.402×10^{6}	
Flax fiber	58	8.4×10^{6}	
Float glass	47.7–83.6	6.92×10^{6}–12.13×10^{6}	
Glass-reinforced polyester (GRP)	17.2	2.49×10^{6}	
Gold	77.2	11.20×10^{6}	
Graphene	1,050	152×10^{6}	
Hemp fiber	35	5.1×10^{6}	
High-density polyethylene (HDPE)	0.97–1.38	0.141×10^{6}–0.200×10^{6}	
High-strength concrete	30	4.4×10^{6}	
Lead (_{82}Pb), chemical	13	1.9×10^{6}	
Low-density polyethylene (LDPE), molded	0.228	0.0331×10^{6}	
Magnesium alloy	45.2	6.56×10^{6}	
Medium-density fiberboard (MDF)	4	0.58×10^{6}	
Molybdenum (Mo), annealed	330	48×10^{6}	
Monel	180	26×10^{6}	
Mother-of-pearl (largely calcium carbonate)	70	10×10^{6}	
Nickel (_{28}Ni), commercial	200	29×10^{6}	
Nylon 66	2.93	0.425×10^{6}	
Osmium (_{76}Os)	525–562	76.1×10^{6}–81.5×10^{6}	
Osmium nitride (OsN_{2})	194.99–396.44	28.281×10^{6}–57.499×10^{6}	
Polycarbonate (PC)	2.2	0.32×10^{6}	
Polyethylene terephthalate (PET), unreinforced	3.14	0.455×10^{6}	
Polypropylene (PP), molded	1.68	0.244×10^{6}	
Polystyrene, crystal	2.5–3.5	0.36×10^{6}–0.51×10^{6}	
Polystyrene, foam	0.0025–0.007	0.00036×10^{6}–0.00102×10^{6}	
Polytetrafluoroethylene (PTFE), molded	0.564	0.0818×10^{6}	
Rubber, small strain	0.01–0.1	0.0015×10^{6}–0.0145×10^{6}	
Silicon, single crystal, different directions	130–185	18.9×10^{6}–26.8×10^{6}	
Silicon carbide (SiC)	90–137	13.1×10^{6}–19.9×10^{6}	
Single-walled carbon nanotube	1,000	150×10^{6}	
Steel, A36	200	29×10^{6}	
Stinging nettle fiber	87	12.6×10^{6}	
Titanium (_{22}Ti)	116	16.8×10^{6}	
Titanium alloy, Grade 5	114	16.5×10^{6}	
Tooth enamel, largely calcium phosphate	83	12.0×10^{6}	
Tungsten carbide (WC)	600–686	87.0×10^{6}–99.5×10^{6}	
Wood, American beech	9.5–11.9	1.38×10^{6}–1.73×10^{6}	
Wood, black cherry	9–10.3	1.31×10^{6}–1.49×10^{6}	
Wood, red maple	9.6–11.3	1.39×10^{6}–1.64×10^{6}	
Wrought iron	193	28.0×10^{6}	
Yttrium iron garnet (YIG), polycrystalline	193	28.0×10^{6}	
Yttrium iron garnet (YIG), single-crystal	200	29×10^{6}	
Zinc (_{30}Zn)	108	15.7×10^{6}	
Zirconium (_{40}Zr), commercial	95	13.8×10^{6}	

== See also ==
- Bending stiffness
- Deformation (engineering)
- Flexural modulus
- Impulse excitation technique
- List of materials properties
- Yield (engineering)

Homogeneous isotropic linear elastic materials have their elastic properties uniquely determined by any two quantities among these; thus, given any two, any other of the elastic moduli can be calculated according to these formulas, provided both for 3D materials (first part of the table) and for 2D materials (second part).
3D Formulae
Knowns	Bulk modulus (K)	Young's modulus (E)	Lamé's first parameter (λ)	Shear modulus (G)	Poisson's ratio (ν)	P-wave modulus (M)	Notes
(K, E)			3K(1 + 6K/(E − 9K))	E/(3 − E/3K)	1/2 − E/6K	(3K + E)/(3 − E/3K)	
(K, λ)		(9K(K − λ))/(3K − λ)		(3(K − λ))/2	λ/(3K − λ)	3K − 2λ	
(K, G)		9KG/(3K + G)	K − 2G/3		(3K − 2G)/(6K + 2G)	K + 4G/3	
(K, ν)		3K(1 − 2ν)	3Kν/(1 + ν)	(3K(1 − 2ν))/(2(1 + ν))		(3K(1 − ν))/(1 + ν)	
(K, M)		(9K(M − K))/(3K + M)	(3K − M)/2	(3(M − K))/4	(3K − M)/(3K + M)		
(E, λ)	(E + 3λ + R)/6			(E − 3λ + R)/4	− (E + R)/4λ − 1/4	(E − λ + R)/2	R = ±(E^{2} + 9λ^{2} + 2Eλ)^{1/2}
(E, G)	EG/(3(3G − E))		(G(E − 2G))/(3G − E)		E/2G − 1	(G(4G − E))/(3G − E)	
(E, ν)	E/(3 − 6ν)		Eν/((1 + ν)(1 − 2ν))	E/(2(1 + ν))		(E(1 − ν))/((1 + ν)(1 − 2ν))	
(E, M)	(3M − E + S)/6		(M − E + S)/4	(3M + E − S)/8	(E + S)/4M − 1/4		S = ±(E^{2} + 9M^{2} − 10EM)^{1/2}
(λ, G)	λ + 2G/3	(G(3λ + 2G))/(λ + G)			λ/(2(λ + G))	λ + 2G	
(λ, ν)	λ/3(1 + 1/ν)	λ(1/ν − 2ν − 1)		λ(1/2ν − 1)		λ(1/ν − 1)	
(λ, M)	(M + 2λ)/3	((M − λ)(M+2λ))/(M + λ)		(M − λ)/2	λ/(M + λ)		
(G, ν)	(2G(1 + ν))/(3 − 6ν)	2G(1 + ν)	(2 G ν)/(1 − 2ν)			(2G(1 − ν))/(1 − 2ν)	
(G, M)	M − 4G/3	(G(3M − 4G))/(M − G)	M − 2G		(M − 2G)/(2M − 2G)		
(ν, M)	(M(1 + ν))/(3(1 − ν))	(M(1 + ν)(1 − 2ν))/(1 − ν)	(M ν)/(1 − ν)	(M(1 − 2ν))/(2(1 − ν))			
2D Formulae
Knowns	(K)	(E)	(λ)	(G)	(ν)	(M)	Notes
(K_{2D}, E_{2D})			(2K_{2D}(2K_{2D} − E_{2D}))/(4K_{2D} − E_{2D})	K_{2D}E_{2D}/(4K_{2D} − E_{2D})	(2K_{2D} − E_{2D})/2K_{2D}	4K_{2D}^2/(4K_{2D} − E_{2D})	
(K_{2D}, λ_{2D})		(4K_{2D}(K_{2D} − λ_{2D}))/(2K_{2D} − λ_{2D})		K_{2D} − λ_{2D}	λ_{2D}/(2K_{2D} − λ_{2D})	2K_{2D} − λ_{2D}	
(K_{2D}, G_{2D})		4K_{2D}G_{2D}/(K_{2D} + G_{2D})	K_{2D} − G_{2D}		(K_{2D} − G_{2D})/(K_{2D} + G_{2D})	K_{2D} + G_{2D}	
(K_{2D}, ν_{2D})		2K_{2D}(1 − ν_{2D})	2K_{2D}ν_{2D}/(1 + ν_{2D})	(K_{2D}(1 − ν_{2D}))/(1 + ν_{2D})		2K_{2D}/(1 + ν_{2D})	
(E_{2D}, G_{2D})	E_{2D}G_{2D}/(4G_{2D} − E_{2D})		(2G_{2D}(E_{2D} − 2G_{2D}))/(4G_{2D} − E_{2D})		E_{2D}/2G_{2D} − 1	4G_{2D}^2/(4G_{2D} − E_{2D})	
(E_{2D}, ν_{2D})	E_{2D}/(2(1 − ν_{2D}))		E_{2D}ν_{2D}/((1 + ν_{2D})(1 − ν_{2D}))	E_{2D}/(2(1 + ν_{2D}))		E_{2D}/((1 + ν_{2D})(1 − ν_{2D}))	
(λ_{2D}, G_{2D})	λ_{2D} + G_{2D}	(4G_{2D}(λ_{2D} + G_{2D}))/(λ_{2D} + 2G_{2D})			λ_{2D}/(λ_{2D} + 2G_{2D})	λ_{2D} + 2G_{2D}	
(λ_{2D}, ν_{2D})	(λ_{2D}(1 + ν_{2D}))/2ν_{2D}	(λ_{2D}(1 + ν_{2D})(1 − ν_{2D}))/ν_{2D}		(λ_{2D}(1 − ν_{2D}))/2ν_{2D}		λ_{2D}/ν_{2D}	
(G_{2D}, ν_{2D})	(G_{2D}(1 + ν_{2D}))/(1 − ν_{2D})	2G_{2D}(1 + ν_{2D})	(2 G_{2D} ν_{2D})/(1 − ν_{2D})			2G_{2D}/(1 − ν_{2D})	
(G_{2D}, M_{2D})	M_{2D} − G_{2D}	(4G_{2D}(M_{2D} − G_{2D}))/M_{2D}	M_{2D} − 2G_{2D}		(M_{2D} − 2G_{2D})/M_{2D}		
