= P-wave modulus =

There are two kinds of seismic body waves in solids, pressure waves (P-waves) and shear waves. In linear elasticity, the P-wave modulus $M$, also known as the longitudinal modulus, or the constrained modulus, is one of the elastic moduli available to describe isotropic homogeneous materials.

It is defined as the ratio of axial stress to axial strain in a uniaxial strain state. This occurs when expansion in the transverse direction is prevented by the inertia of neighboring material, such as in an earthquake, or underwater seismic blast.

$$\sigma_{zz} = M \epsilon_{zz}$$

where all the other strains $\epsilon_{**}$ are zero.

This is equivalent to stating that

$$M_{x} = \rho_{x} V_\mathrm{P}^2 ,$$

where V_{P} is the velocity of a P-wave and ρ is the density of the material through which the wave is propagating.

Homogeneous isotropic linear elastic materials have their elastic properties uniquely determined by any two quantities among these; thus, given any two, any other of the elastic moduli can be calculated according to these formulas, provided both for 3D materials (first part of the table) and for 2D materials (second part).
3D Formulae
Knowns	Bulk modulus (K)	Young's modulus (E)	Lamé's first parameter (λ)	Shear modulus (G)	Poisson's ratio (ν)	P-wave modulus (M)	Notes
(K, E)			3K(1 + 6K/(E − 9K))	E/(3 − E/3K)	1/2 − E/6K	(3K + E)/(3 − E/3K)	
(K, λ)		(9K(K − λ))/(3K − λ)		(3(K − λ))/2	λ/(3K − λ)	3K − 2λ	
(K, G)		9KG/(3K + G)	K − 2G/3		(3K − 2G)/(6K + 2G)	K + 4G/3	
(K, ν)		3K(1 − 2ν)	3Kν/(1 + ν)	(3K(1 − 2ν))/(2(1 + ν))		(3K(1 − ν))/(1 + ν)	
(K, M)		(9K(M − K))/(3K + M)	(3K − M)/2	(3(M − K))/4	(3K − M)/(3K + M)		
(E, λ)	(E + 3λ + R)/6			(E − 3λ + R)/4	− (E + R)/4λ − 1/4	(E − λ + R)/2	R = ±(E^{2} + 9λ^{2} + 2Eλ)^{1/2}
(E, G)	EG/(3(3G − E))		(G(E − 2G))/(3G − E)		E/2G − 1	(G(4G − E))/(3G − E)	
(E, ν)	E/(3 − 6ν)		Eν/((1 + ν)(1 − 2ν))	E/(2(1 + ν))		(E(1 − ν))/((1 + ν)(1 − 2ν))	
(E, M)	(3M − E + S)/6		(M − E + S)/4	(3M + E − S)/8	(E + S)/4M − 1/4		S = ±(E^{2} + 9M^{2} − 10EM)^{1/2}
(λ, G)	λ + 2G/3	(G(3λ + 2G))/(λ + G)			λ/(2(λ + G))	λ + 2G	
(λ, ν)	λ/3(1 + 1/ν)	λ(1/ν − 2ν − 1)		λ(1/2ν − 1)		λ(1/ν − 1)	
(λ, M)	(M + 2λ)/3	((M − λ)(M+2λ))/(M + λ)		(M − λ)/2	λ/(M + λ)		
(G, ν)	(2G(1 + ν))/(3 − 6ν)	2G(1 + ν)	(2 G ν)/(1 − 2ν)			(2G(1 − ν))/(1 − 2ν)	
(G, M)	M − 4G/3	(G(3M − 4G))/(M − G)	M − 2G		(M − 2G)/(2M − 2G)		
(ν, M)	(M(1 + ν))/(3(1 − ν))	(M(1 + ν)(1 − 2ν))/(1 − ν)	(M ν)/(1 − ν)	(M(1 − 2ν))/(2(1 − ν))			
2D Formulae
Knowns	(K)	(E)	(λ)	(G)	(ν)	(M)	Notes
(K_{2D}, E_{2D})			(2K_{2D}(2K_{2D} − E_{2D}))/(4K_{2D} − E_{2D})	K_{2D}E_{2D}/(4K_{2D} − E_{2D})	(2K_{2D} − E_{2D})/2K_{2D}	4K_{2D}^2/(4K_{2D} − E_{2D})	
(K_{2D}, λ_{2D})		(4K_{2D}(K_{2D} − λ_{2D}))/(2K_{2D} − λ_{2D})		K_{2D} − λ_{2D}	λ_{2D}/(2K_{2D} − λ_{2D})	2K_{2D} − λ_{2D}	
(K_{2D}, G_{2D})		4K_{2D}G_{2D}/(K_{2D} + G_{2D})	K_{2D} − G_{2D}		(K_{2D} − G_{2D})/(K_{2D} + G_{2D})	K_{2D} + G_{2D}	
(K_{2D}, ν_{2D})		2K_{2D}(1 − ν_{2D})	2K_{2D}ν_{2D}/(1 + ν_{2D})	(K_{2D}(1 − ν_{2D}))/(1 + ν_{2D})		2K_{2D}/(1 + ν_{2D})	
(E_{2D}, G_{2D})	E_{2D}G_{2D}/(4G_{2D} − E_{2D})		(2G_{2D}(E_{2D} − 2G_{2D}))/(4G_{2D} − E_{2D})		E_{2D}/2G_{2D} − 1	4G_{2D}^2/(4G_{2D} − E_{2D})	
(E_{2D}, ν_{2D})	E_{2D}/(2(1 − ν_{2D}))		E_{2D}ν_{2D}/((1 + ν_{2D})(1 − ν_{2D}))	E_{2D}/(2(1 + ν_{2D}))		E_{2D}/((1 + ν_{2D})(1 − ν_{2D}))	
(λ_{2D}, G_{2D})	λ_{2D} + G_{2D}	(4G_{2D}(λ_{2D} + G_{2D}))/(λ_{2D} + 2G_{2D})			λ_{2D}/(λ_{2D} + 2G_{2D})	λ_{2D} + 2G_{2D}	
(λ_{2D}, ν_{2D})	(λ_{2D}(1 + ν_{2D}))/2ν_{2D}	(λ_{2D}(1 + ν_{2D})(1 − ν_{2D}))/ν_{2D}		(λ_{2D}(1 − ν_{2D}))/2ν_{2D}		λ_{2D}/ν_{2D}	
(G_{2D}, ν_{2D})	(G_{2D}(1 + ν_{2D}))/(1 − ν_{2D})	2G_{2D}(1 + ν_{2D})	(2 G_{2D} ν_{2D})/(1 − ν_{2D})			2G_{2D}/(1 − ν_{2D})	
(G_{2D}, M_{2D})	M_{2D} − G_{2D}	(4G_{2D}(M_{2D} − G_{2D}))/M_{2D}	M_{2D} − 2G_{2D}		(M_{2D} − 2G_{2D})/M_{2D}		
