= Bending stiffness =

Continuum mechanics

The bending stiffness ($K$) is the resistance of a member against bending deflection/deformation. It is a function of the Young's modulus $E$, the second moment of area $I$ of the beam cross-section about the axis of interest, length of the beam and beam boundary condition. Bending stiffness of a beam can analytically be derived from the equation of beam deflection when it is applied by a force.

$$K = \frac{\mathrm{p}}{\mathrm{w}}$$

where $\mathrm{p}$ is the applied force and $\mathrm{w}$ is the deflection. According to elementary beam theory, the relationship between the applied bending moment $M$ and the resulting curvature $\kappa$ of the beam is:

$$M = E I \kappa \approx E I \frac{\mathrm{d}^2 w}{\mathrm{d} x^2}$$

where $w$ is the deflection of the beam and $x$ is the distance along the beam. Double integration of the above equation leads to computing the deflection of the beam, and in turn, the bending stiffness of the beam. Bending stiffness in beams is also known as Flexural rigidity.

== See also ==
- Applied mechanics
- Beam theory
- Bending
- Stiffness
