= Elasticity tensor =

Stress-strain relation in a linear elastic material

The elasticity tensor is a fourth-rank tensor describing the stress-strain relation in a linear elastic material. Other names are elastic modulus tensor and stiffness tensor. Common symbols include $\mathbf{C}$ and $\mathbf{Y}$.

The defining equation can be written as

$$T^{ij} = C^{ijkl} E_{kl}$$

where $T^{ij}$ and $E_{kl}$ are the components of the Cauchy stress tensor and infinitesimal strain tensor, and $C^{ijkl}$ are the components of the elasticity tensor. Summation over repeated indices is implied. (Note: Here, upper and lower indices denote contravariant and covariant components, respectively, though the distinction can be ignored for Cartesian coordinates. As a result, some references represent components using only lower indices.) This relationship can be interpreted as a generalization of Hooke's law to a 3D continuum.

A general fourth-rank tensor $\mathbf{F}$ in 3D has 3^{4} = 81 independent components $F_{ijkl}$, but the elasticity tensor has at most 21 independent components. This fact follows from the symmetry of the stress and strain tensors, together with the requirement that the stress derives from an elastic energy potential. For isotropic materials, the elasticity tensor has just two independent components, which can be chosen to be the bulk modulus and shear modulus.

== Definition ==
The most general linear relation between two second-rank tensors $\mathbf{T}, \mathbf{E}$ is

$$T^{ij} = C^{ijkl} E_{kl}$$

where $C^{ijkl}$ are the components of a fourth-rank tensor $\mathbf{C}$. The elasticity tensor is defined as $\mathbf{C}$ for the case where $\mathbf{T}$ and $\mathbf{E}$ are the stress and strain tensors, respectively.

The compliance tensor $\mathbf{K}$ is defined from the inverse stress-strain relation:

$$E^{ij} = K^{ijkl} T_{kl}$$

The two are related by

$$K_{ijpq} C^{pqkl} = \frac{1}{2} \left(\delta_{i}^{k} \delta_{j}^{l} + \delta_{i}^{l} \delta_{j}^{k} \right)$$

where $\delta_{n}^{m}$ is the Kronecker delta. (Note: Combining the forward and inverse stress-strain relations gives E_{ij} = K_{ijpq} C^{pqkl}E_{kl}. Due to the minor symmetries C^{pqkl} = C^{qpkl} and C^{pqkl} = C^{pqlk}, this equation does not uniquely determine K_{ijpq} C^{pqkl}. In fact, K_{ijpq} C^{pqkl}= a δ^{k}_{i}δ^{l}_{j} + (1 − a) δ^{l}_{i}δ^{k}_{j} is a solution for any 0 ≤ a ≤ 1. However, only a = 1/2 preserves the minor symmetries of K, so this is the correct solution from a physical standpoint.)

Unless otherwise noted, this article assumes $\mathbf{C}$ is defined from the stress-strain relation of a linear elastic material, in the limit of small strain.

== Special cases ==
=== Isotropic ===
For an isotropic material, $\mathbf{C}$ simplifies to

$$C^{ijkl} = \lambda \!\left( X \right) g^{ij} g^{kl} + \mu\!\left( X \right) \left(g^{ik} g^{jl} + g^{il} g^{kj} \right)$$

where $\lambda$ and $\mu$ are scalar functions of the material coordinates $X$, and $\mathbf{g}$ is the metric tensor in the reference frame of the material. In an orthonormal Cartesian coordinate basis, there is no distinction between upper and lower indices, and the metric tensor can be replaced with the Kronecker delta:

$$C_{ijkl} = \lambda \!\left( X \right) \delta_{ij} \delta_{kl} + \mu\!\left( X \right) \left(\delta_{ik} \delta_{jl} + \delta_{il} \delta_{kj} \right) \quad \text{[Cartesian coordinates]}$$

Substituting the first equation into the stress-strain relation and summing over repeated indices gives

$$T^{ij} = \lambda \!\left( X \right) \cdot \left(\mathrm{Tr} \, \mathbf{E} \right) g^{ij} + 2 \mu\!\left( X \right) E^{ij}$$

where $\mathrm{Tr}\, \mathbf{E} \equiv E^i_{\,i}$ is the trace of $\mathbf{E}$. In this form, $\mu$ and $\lambda$ can be identified with the first and second Lamé parameters. An equivalent expression is

$$T^{ij} = K \!\left( X \right) \cdot \left(\mathrm{Tr}\, \mathbf{E} \right)  g^{ij} + 2 \mu\!\left( X \right)\Sigma^{ij}$$

where $K = \lambda + (2/3) \mu$ is the bulk modulus, and

$$\Sigma^{ij} \equiv E^{ij} - (1/3)\left(\mathrm{Tr}\, \mathbf{E} \right) g^{ij}$$

are the components of the shear tensor $\mathbf{\Sigma}$.

=== Cubic crystals ===
The elasticity tensor of a cubic crystal has components

$$\begin{align}
C^{ijkl} &= \lambda g^{ij} g^{kl} + \mu \left(g^{ik} g^{jl} + g^{il} g^{kj} \right) \\ &+ \alpha \left(a^i a^j a^k a^l + b^i b^j b^k b^l + c^i c^j c^k c^l\right)
\end{align}$$

where $\mathbf{a}$, $\mathbf{b}$, and $\mathbf{c}$ are unit vectors corresponding to the three mutually perpendicular axes of the crystal unit cell. The coefficients $\lambda$, $\mu$, and $\alpha$ are scalars; because they are coordinate-independent, they are intrinsic material constants. Thus, a crystal with cubic symmetry is described by three independent elastic constants.

In an orthonormal Cartesian coordinate basis, there is no distinction between upper and lower indices, and $g^{ij}$ is the Kronecker delta, so the expression simplifies to

$$\begin{align}
C_{ijkl} &= \lambda \delta_{ij} \delta_{kl} + \mu \left(\delta_{ik} \delta_{jl} + \delta_{il} \delta_{kj} \right) \\ &+ \alpha \left(a_i a_j a_k a_l + b_i b_j b_k b_l + c_i c_j c_k c_l\right)
\end{align}$$

=== Other crystal classes ===
There are similar expressions for the components of $\mathbf{C}$ in other crystal symmetry classes. The number of independent elastic constants for several of these is given in table 1.

Table 1: Number of independent elastic constants for various crystal symmetry classes.
Crystal family	Point group	Independent components
Triclinic		21
Monoclinic		13
Orthorhombic		9
Tetragonal	C_{4}, S_{4}, C_{4h}	7
Tetragonal	C_{4v}, D_{2d}, D_{4}, D_{4h}	6
Rhombohedral	C_{3}, S_{6}	7
Rhombohedral	C_{3v}, D_{6}, D_{3d}	6
Hexagonal		5
Cubic		3

== Properties ==
=== Symmetries ===
The elasticity tensor has several symmetries that follow directly from its defining equation $T^{ij} = C^{ijkl} E_{kl}$. The symmetry of the stress and strain tensors implies that

$$C_{ijkl} = C_{jikl} \qquad \text{and} \qquad C_{ijkl} = C_{ijlk},$$

Usually, one also assumes that the stress derives from an elastic energy potential $U$:

$$T^{ij} = \frac{\partial U}{\partial E_{ij}}$$

which implies

$$C_{ijkl} = \frac{\partial^2 U}{\partial E_{ij}\partial E_{kl}}$$

Hence, $\mathbf{C}$ must be symmetric under interchange of the first and second pairs of indices:

$$C_{ijkl} = C_{klij}$$

The symmetries listed above reduce the number of independent components from 81 to 21. If a material has additional symmetries, then this number is further reduced.

=== Transformations ===
Under rotation, the components $C^{ijkl}$ transform as

$$C'_{ijkl} = R_{ip} R_{jq} R_{kr} R_{ls} C^{pqrs}$$

where $C'_{ijkl}$ are the covariant components in the rotated basis, and $R_{ij}$ are the elements of the corresponding rotation matrix. A similar transformation rule holds for other linear transformations.

=== Invariants ===
The components of $\mathbf{C}$ generally acquire different values under a change of basis. Nevertheless, for certain types of transformations, there are specific combinations of components, called invariants, that remain unchanged. Invariants are defined with respect to a given set of transformations, formally known as a group operation. For example, an invariant with respect to the group of proper orthogonal transformations, called SO(3), is a quantity that remains constant under arbitrary 3D rotations.

$\mathbf{C}$ possesses two linear invariants and seven quadratic invariants with respect to SO(3). The linear invariants are

$$\begin{align}
L_1 &= C^{ij}_{\,\,\,ij} \\
L_2 &= C^{ii}_{\,\,\,jj}
\end{align}$$

and the quadratic invariants are

$$\left\{ L_1^2, \, L_2^2, \, L_1 L_2, \, C_{ijkl} C^{ijkl}, \,C_{iikl} C^{jjkl}, \,C_{iikl} C^{jkjl}, \,C_{kiil} C^{kjjl} \right\}$$

These quantities are linearly independent, that is, none can be expressed as a linear combination of the others. They are also complete, in the sense that there are no additional independent linear or quadratic invariants.

== Decompositions ==
A common strategy in tensor analysis is to decompose a tensor into simpler components that can be analyzed separately. For example, the displacement gradient tensor $\mathbf{W} = \mathbf{\nabla} \mathbf{\xi}$ can be decomposed as

$$\mathbf{W} = \frac{1}{3} \Theta \mathbf{g} + \mathbf{\Sigma} + \mathbf{R}$$

where $\Theta$ is a rank-0 tensor (a scalar), equal to the trace of $\mathbf{W}$; $\mathbf{\Sigma}$ is symmetric and trace-free; and $\mathbf{R}$ is antisymmetric. Component-wise,

$$\begin{align}
\Sigma^{ij} \equiv W^{(ij)} &= \frac{1}{2} \left(W^{ij} + W^{ji} \right) - \frac{1}{3} \left(\mathrm{Tr}\, \mathbf{W} \right) g^{ij} \\
R^{ij} \equiv W^{[ij]} &= \frac{1}{2} \left(W^{ij} - W^{ji} \right)
\end{align}$$

Here and later, symmetrization and antisymmetrization are denoted by $(ij)$ and $[ij]$, respectively. This decomposition is irreducible, in the sense of being invariant under rotations, and is an important tool in the conceptual development of continuum mechanics.

The elasticity tensor has rank 4, and its decompositions are more complex and varied than those of a rank-2 tensor. A few examples are described below.

=== M and N tensors ===
This decomposition is obtained by symmeterization and antisymmeterization of the middle two indices:

$$C^{ijkl} = M^{ijkl} + N^{ijkl}$$

where

$$\begin{align}
M^{ijkl} \equiv C^{i(jk)l} = \frac{1}{2}\left(C^{ijkl} + C^{ikjl} \right) \\
N^{ijkl} \equiv C^{i[jk]l} = \frac{1}{2}\left(C^{ijkl} - C^{ikjl} \right)
\end{align}$$

A disadvantage of this decomposition is that $M^{ijkl}$ and $N^{ijkl}$ do not obey all original symmetries of $C^{ijkl}$, as they are not symmetric under interchange of the first two indices. In addition, it is not irreducible, so it is not invariant under linear transformations such as rotations.

=== Irreducible representations ===
An irreducible representation can be built by considering the notion of a totally symmetric tensor, which is invariant under the interchange of any two indices. A totally symmetric tensor $\mathbf{S}$ can be constructed from $\mathbf{C}$ by summing over all $4! = 24$ permutations of the indices

$$\begin{align}
S^{ijkl} &= \frac{1}{4!}\sum_{(i,j,k,l)\in S_4} C^{ijkl} \\ &=\frac{1}{4!}\left(C^{ijkl} + C^{jikl}+ C^{ikjl} + \ldots \right)
\end{align}$$

where $\mathbb{S}_4$ is the set of all permutations of the four indices. Owing to the symmetries of $C^{ijkl}$, this sum reduces to

$$S^{ijkl} = \frac{1}{3}\left(C^{ijkl} + C^{iklj} + C^{iljk} \right)$$

The difference

$$A^{ijkl} \equiv C^{ijkl} - S^{ijkl} = \frac{1}{3}\left(2 C^{ijkl} - C^{ilkj} - C^{iklj} \right)$$

is an asymmetric tensor (not antisymmetric). The decomposition $C^{ijkl} = S^{ijkl} + A^{ijkl}$ can be shown to be unique and irreducible with respect to $\mathbb{S}_4$. In other words, any additional symmetrization operations on $\mathbf{S}$ or $\mathbf{A}$ will either leave it unchanged or evaluate to zero. It is also irreducible with respect to arbitrary linear transformations, that is, the general linear group $G(3,\mathbb{R})$.

However, this decomposition is not irreducible with respect to the group of rotations SO(3). Instead, $\mathbf{S}$ decomposes into three irreducible parts, and $\mathbf{A}$ into two:

$$\begin{align}
C^{ijkl} &= S^{ijkl} + A^{ijkl} \\
&= \left(^{(1)}\!S^{ijkl} + \, ^{(2)}\!S^{ijkl} + \, ^{(3)}\!S^{ijkl} \right) + \, \left(^{(1)}\!A^{ijkl} + ^{(2)}\!A^{ijkl} \right)
\end{align}$$

See Itin (2020) for explicit expressions in terms of the components of $\mathbf{C}$.

This representation decomposes the space of elasticity tensors into a direct sum of subspaces:

$$\mathcal{C} = \left(^{(1)}\!\mathcal{C} \oplus \, ^{(2)}\!\mathcal{C} \oplus \, ^{(3)}\!\mathcal{C} \right) \oplus \, \left(^{(4)}\!\mathcal{C} \oplus \, ^{(5)}\!\mathcal{C} \right)$$

with dimensions

$$21 = (1 \oplus 5 \oplus 9) \oplus (1 \oplus 5)$$

These subspaces are each isomorphic to a harmonic tensor space $\mathbb{H}_n(\mathbb{R}^3)$. Here, $\mathbb{H}_n(\mathbb{R}^3)$ is the space of 3D, totally symmetric, traceless tensors of rank $n$. In particular, $^{(1)}\!\mathcal{C}$ and $^{(4)}\!\mathcal{C}$ correspond to $\mathbb{H}_0$, $^{(2)}\!\mathcal{C}$ and $^{(5)}\!\mathcal{C}$ correspond to $\mathbb{H}_2$, and $^{(3)}\!\mathcal{C}$ corresponds to $\mathbb{H}_4$.

== See also ==
- Continuum mechanics
- Solid mechanics
- Constitutive equation
- Strength of materials
- List of materials properties § Mechanical properties
- Representation theory of finite groups
- Voigt notation

== Bibliography ==
- The Feynman Lectures on Physics - The tensor of elasticity
- Cowin, Stephen C. (1989). "Properties of the Anisotropic Elasticity Tensor". The Quarterly Journal of Mechanics and Applied Mathematics. 42 (2): 249–266. doi:10.1093/qjmam/42.2.249. eISSN 1464-3855. ISSN 0033-5614.
- Hehl, Friedrich W.; Itin, Yakov (2002). "The Cauchy Relations in Linear Elasticity Theory". Journal of Elasticity and the Physical Science of Solids. 66 (2): 185–192. arXiv:cond-mat/0206175. doi:10.1023/A:1021225230036. ISSN 0374-3535. S2CID 18618340.
- Hill, R. (April 1965). "Continuum micro-mechanics of elastoplastic polycrystals". Journal of the Mechanics and Physics of Solids. 13 (2): 89–101. Bibcode:1965JMPSo..13...89H. doi:10.1016/0022-5096(65)90023-2. ISSN 0022-5096.
- Itin, Yakov; Hehl, Friedrich W. (April 2013). "The constitutive tensor of linear elasticity: Its decompositions, Cauchy relations, null Lagrangians, and wave propagation". Journal of Mathematical Physics. 54 (4): 042903. arXiv:1208.1041. Bibcode:2013JMP....54d2903I. doi:10.1063/1.4801859. eISSN 1089-7658. ISSN 0022-2488. S2CID 119133966.
- Itin, Yakov (20 April 2020). "Irreducible matrix resolution for symmetry classes of elasticity tensors". Mathematics and Mechanics of Solids. 25 (10): 1873–1895. arXiv:1812.03367. doi:10.1177/1081286520913596. eISSN 1741-3028. ISSN 1081-2865. S2CID 219087296.
- Landau, Lev D.; Lifshitz, Evgeny M. (1970). Theory of Elasticity. Vol. 7 (2nd ed.). Pergamon Press. ISBN 978-0-08-006465-9.
- Marsden, Jerrold E.; Hughes, Thomas J. R. (1994). Mathematical Foundations of Elasticity. Dover Publications. ISBN 978-0-486-67865-8. OCLC 1117171567.
- Moakher, Maher; Norris, Andrew N. (5 October 2006). "The Closest Elastic Tensor of Arbitrary Symmetry to an Elasticity Tensor of Lower Symmetry" (PDF). Journal of Elasticity. 85 (3): 215–263. doi:10.1007/s10659-006-9082-0. eISSN 1573-2681. ISSN 0374-3535. S2CID 12816173.
- Norris, A. N. (22 May 2007). "Quadratic invariants of elastic moduli". The Quarterly Journal of Mechanics and Applied Mathematics. 60 (3): 367–389. arXiv:cond-mat/0612506. doi:10.1093/qjmam/hbm007. eISSN 1464-3855. ISSN 0033-5614.
- Olive, M.; Kolev, B.; Auffray, N. (2017-05-24). "A Minimal Integrity Basis for the Elasticity Tensor". Archive for Rational Mechanics and Analysis. 226 (1). Springer Science and Business Media LLC: 1–31. arXiv:1605.09561. Bibcode:2017ArRMA.226....1O. doi:10.1007/s00205-017-1127-y. ISSN 0003-9527. S2CID 253711197.
- Srinivasan, T.P.; Nigam, S.D. (1969). "Invariant Elastic Constants for Crystals". Journal of Mathematics and Mechanics. 19 (5): 411–420. eISSN 0095-9057. ISSN 1943-5274. JSTOR 24901866.
- Thomas, T. Y. (February 1966). "On the stress-strain relations for cubic crystals". Proceedings of the National Academy of Sciences. 55 (2): 235–239. Bibcode:1966PNAS...55..235T. doi:10.1073/pnas.55.2.235. eISSN 1091-6490. ISSN 0027-8424. PMC 224128. PMID 16591328.
- Thorne, Kip S.; Blandford, Roger D. (2017). Modern Classical Physics: Optics, Fluids, Plasmas, Elasticity, Relativity, and Statistical Physics. Princeton University Press. ISBN 9780691159027.
