= Quasistatic loading =

In solid mechanics, quasistatic loading refers to loading where inertial effects are negligible. In other words, time and inertial force are irrelevant.
