= Auxetics =

Materials that have a negative Poisson's ratio

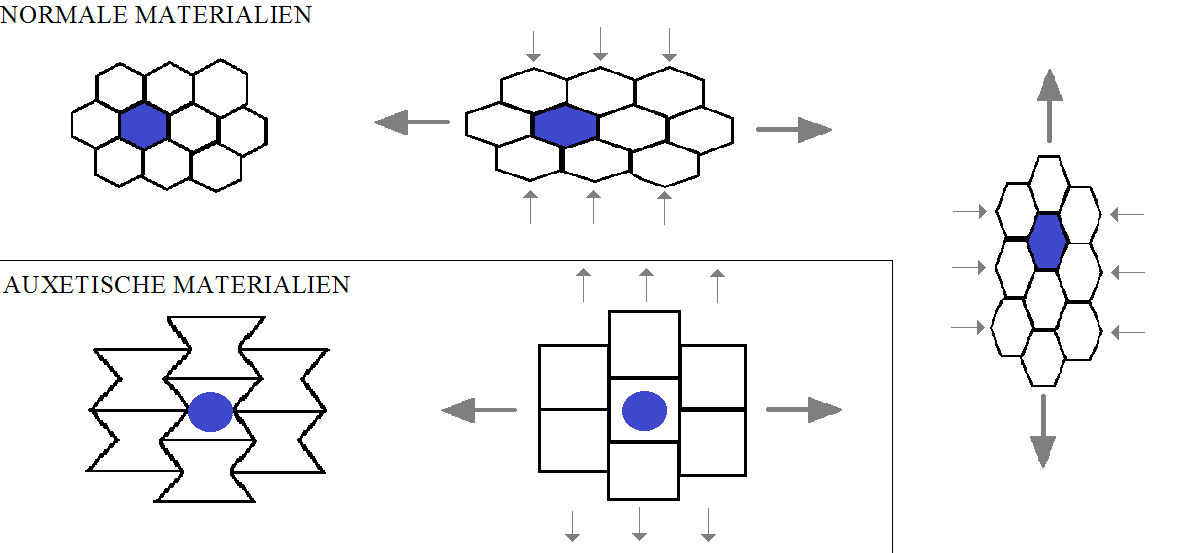

Auxetic metamaterials are a type of metamaterial with a negative Poisson's ratio, so that axial elongation causes transversal elongation (in contrast to an ordinary material, where stretching in one direction causes compression in the other direction).

Auxetics can be single molecules, crystals, or a particular structure of macroscopic matter.

Auxetic materials are used in protective equipment such as body armor, helmets, and knee pads, as they absorb energy more effectively than traditional materials. They are also used in devices such as medical stents or implants. Auxetic fabrics can be used to create comfortable and flexible clothing, as well as technical fabrics for applications such as aerospace and sports equipment. Auxetic materials can also be used to create acoustic metamaterials for controlling sound and vibration.

== History ==
The term auxetic derives from the Greek word auxetikos (αὐξητικός) which means 'that which tends to increase' and has its root in the word auxesis (αὔξησις), meaning 'increase' (noun). This terminology was coined by Professor Ken Evans of the University of Exeter. One of the first artificially produced auxetic materials, the RFS structure (diamond-fold structure), was invented in 1978 by the Berlin researcher K. Pietsch. Although he did not use the term auxetics, he describes for the first time the underlying lever mechanism and its non-linear mechanical reaction so he is therefore considered the inventor of the auxetic net. The earliest published example of a material with negative Poisson's constant is due to A. G. Kolpakov in 1985, "Determination of the average characteristics of elastic frameworks"; the next synthetic auxetic material was described in Science in 1987, entitled "Foam structures with a Negative Poisson's Ratio" by R.S. Lakes from the University of Wisconsin Madison. The use of the word auxetic to refer to this property probably began in 1991. Recently, cells were shown to display a biological version of auxeticity under certain conditions.

Designs of composites with inverted hexagonal periodicity cell (auxetic hexagon), possessing negative Poisson ratios, were published in 1985.

For these reasons, gradually, many researchers have become interested in the unique properties of auxetics. In 25 years, the number of publications increased from one in 1991 to 165 in 2016. However, although auxetics are promising structures and have a lot of potential in science and engineering, their widespread application in multiple fields is still a challenge. Therefore, additional research related to auxetics is required for widespread applications.

== Properties ==
Typically, auxetic materials have low density, which is what allows the hinge-like areas of the auxetic microstructures to flex.

At the macroscale, auxetic behaviour can be illustrated with an inelastic string wound around an elastic cord. When the ends of the structure are pulled apart, the inelastic string straightens while the elastic cord stretches and winds around it, increasing the structure's effective volume. Auxetic behaviour at the macroscale can also be employed for the development of products with enhanced characteristics such as footwear based on the auxetic rotating triangles structures developed by Grima and Evans and prosthetic feet with human-like toe joint properties.

Auxetic materials also occur organically, although they are structurally different from man-made metamaterials. For example, the nuclei of mouse embryonic stem cells in a transition state display auxetic behavior.

== Examples ==
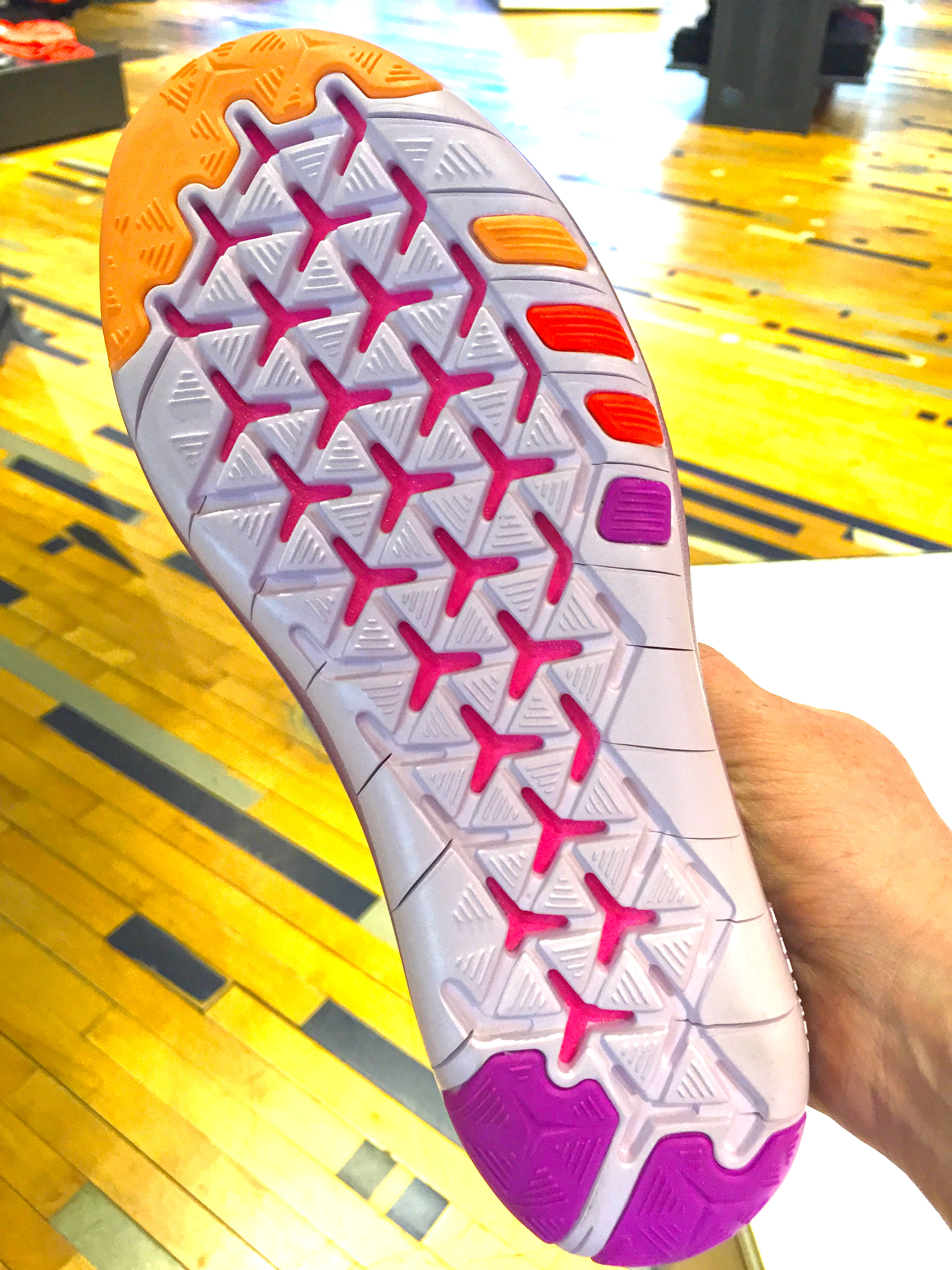
In footwear, auxetic design allows the sole to expand in size while walking or running, thereby increasing flexibility.

Examples of auxetic materials include:

- Auxetic polyurethane foam
- Nuclei of mouse embryonic stem cells in exiting pluripotent state
- α-Cristobalite.
- Certain states of crystalline materials: Li, Na, K, Cu, Rb, Ag, Fe, Ni, Co, Cs, Au, Be, Ca, Zn Sr, Sb, MoS_{2}, BAsO_{4}, and others.
- Certain rocks and minerals
- Graphene, which can be made auxetic through the introduction of vacancy defects
- Carbon diamond-like phases
- Two-dimensional tungsten semicarbide
- Noncarbon nanotubes
- Living bone tissue (although this is only suspected)
- Tendons within their normal range of motion.
- Specific variants of polytetrafluorethylene polymers such as Gore-Tex
- Several types of origami folds like the Diamond-Folding-Structure (RFS), the herringbone-fold-structure (FFS) or the miura fold, and other periodic patterns derived from it.

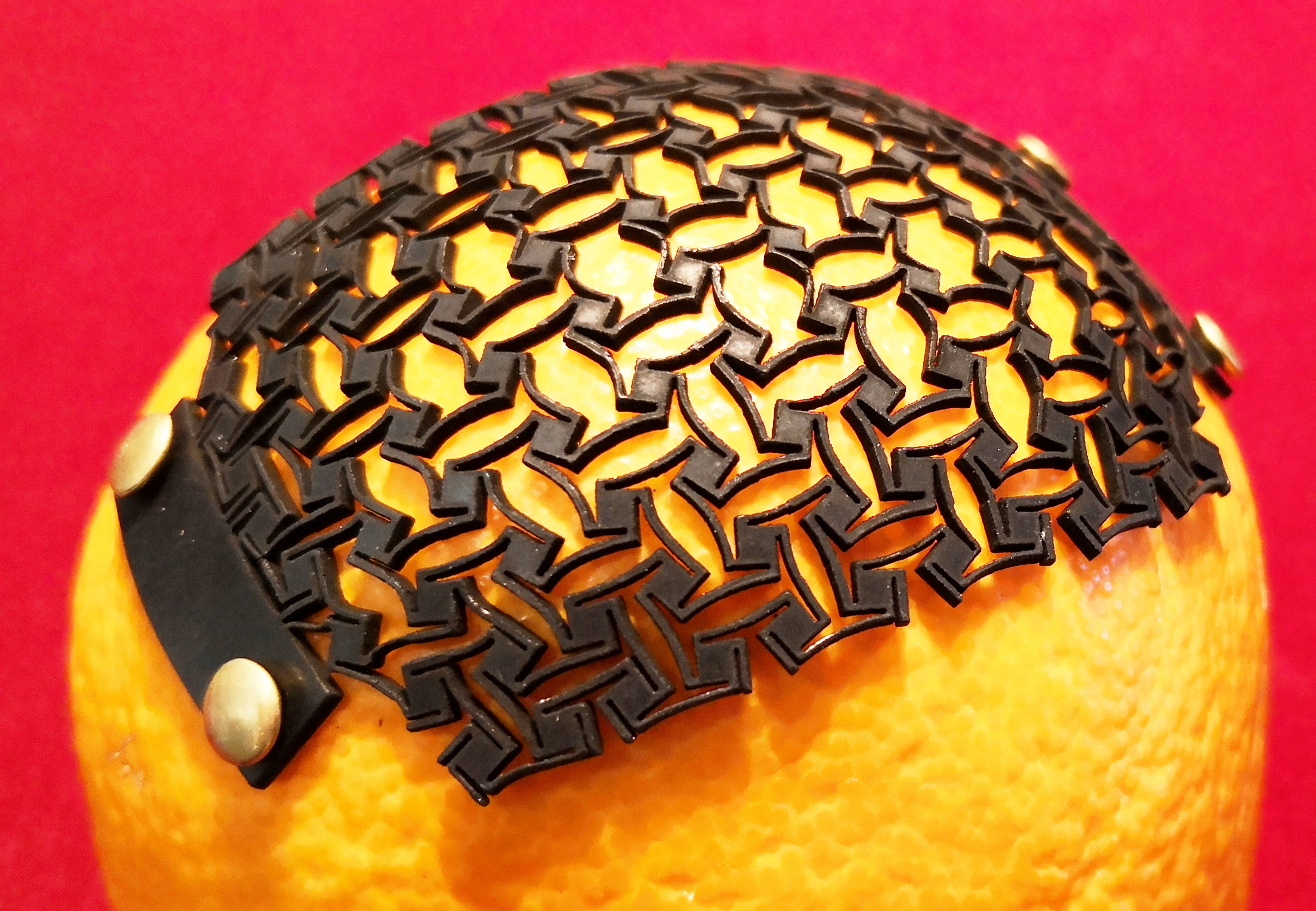
Production of auxetic metamaterials through the introduction of patterned microstructural cuts using direct laser cutting. The thin rubber surface with perforated architecture covers a spherical surface (orange)

- Tailored structures designed to exhibit special designed Poisson's ratios.
- Chain organic molecules. Recent researches revealed that organic crystals like n-paraffins and similar to them may demonstrate an auxetic behavior.

== Applications ==
Auxetics are used in garments, origami, and chemicals.

Synthetic auxetics using a bio-inspired lattice structure (BLS) are reported to supply 13 times more stiffness, absorb 10% more energy, and exhibit a 60% greater strain range than existing auxetic materials. Potential applications include construction material, protective sports gear, and medical products.

== See also ==
- Acoustic metamaterial
- Mechanical metamaterial
- Metamaterial
- Parallelogon
- Zetix, a type of commercially manufactured auxetic material
