= Scientific terminology =

Subset of language

Scientific terminology refers to the specialized vocabulary used by scientists and engineers in their professional fields. It encompasses words and expressions created to name newly discovered or invented concepts, materials, methods, and phenomena.

In the early modern period, scientific terminology was predominantly Latin, resulting in naming practices that have persisted into the present.

In science, "naming a particle [or concept] is not just convenient; it marks a leap forward in our understanding of the world". Thus, new technical terms, neologisms, often arise whenever science advances. For example, the term nanotechnology was coined in 1974 to describe precise engineering at the atomic scale. More generally, neologisms have long been driven by technology and science: "technological advances are among the main drivers of word creation… In many cases, neologisms come about as names for new objects". Likewise, language scholars observe that "science is an especially productive field for new coinages," and scientific terms often spread immediately across languages through research publications. Over time, many such technical terms (e.g. laser, radar, DNA) enter common usage, though at first, they denote concepts known mainly within the field.

== New concepts ==
Scientists frequently introduce new names for novel concepts or discoveries. Every time a new phenomenon, particle, material, or device is identified, researchers coin a term to describe it. For instance, in physics new fundamental particles have been named quark, gluon, lepton, graviton, neutrino, Higgs boson, mendelevium (a chemical element), etc. – typically chosen by their discoverers, often honoring a scientist or using classical roots. (Many particle names, like muon or tau, derive from Greek letters; others like electron come from Greek words for amber.) One physics review notes that assigning a name to a newly discovered particle "marks a leap forward" in science. Similarly, interdisciplinary fields often receive portmanteau names by combining existing words. For example, biotechnology, nanotechnology, and astrophysics were coined by joining roots or terms to form a new word. These composite terms help label entire new fields of research and are usually understandable to non-experts.

=== New materials ===
Modern science continually searches for materials with novel properties, and naming them is part of that process. For example, carbon-based nanomaterials like carbon nanotubes and graphene were given new names as they were discovered. One source explains that science's focus on advanced materials leads to "an extensive search for new materials having unusual or superior properties" whose names fall into categories like new substances (e.g. nanotubes) or registered trademarks (e.g. Teflon). Such names range from systematic descriptors (glass, steel types, composites) to brand names or acronyms for proprietary materials. Over time, some material names (like transistor or laser) become so widespread that they lose their "technical" feel and enter everyday language.

=== New techniques and devices ===
New experimental methods and instruments also generate terms. Scientists name each new technique (e.g. polymerase chain reaction, X-ray crystallography) and each new instrument (e.g. scanning tunneling microscope, SQUID detector) to reflect their function. For instance, the scanning tunneling microscope (invented 1981) is usually referred to by its full name. Other devices, like transistor, magnetron, laser, were named at their invention and have since become common words. In general, the names of modern devices and methods are coined to describe how they work, often using existing roots or honorifics (e.g. PET scan, MRI for magnetic resonance imaging, PCR as an acronym for polymerase chain reaction).

=== Alternative meaning of common words ===
SIESTA, SQUID and SHRIMP are acronyms distinguished from siesta, squid and shrimp by capitalization. However, there are pairs of scientific terminology and common words, which can only be distinguished by context. Representative examples come from particle physics where certain properties of particles are called flavor, color, but have no relation to conventional flavor and color. Another famous example is frustration used to describe ground state properties in condensed matter physics, and especially in magnetic systems.

=== Composite words ===
Recent scientific activity often creates interdisciplinary fields, for which new names, classified into portmanteau words or syllabic abbreviations, are often created by combining two or more words, sometimes with extra prefixes and suffixes. Examples of those – biotechnology, nanotechnology, etc. – are well known and understood, at least superficially, by most non-scientists.

=== Elementary particles, quasiparticles and chemical elements ===
Progress of particle physics, nuclear physics and atomic physics has resulted in discoveries of new elementary particles and atoms. Their names – quark, gluon, lepton, graviton, neutrino, Higgs boson, mendelevium, etc. – are traditionally given by those people who first discovered them and often include surnames of classical scientists.

Fundamental particles are particles that are not made up by any other particles, such as a quark.

Another group of physics terminology terms, exciton, magnon, phonon, plasmon, phason, polaron, roton etc., refers to quasiparticles – quanta of corresponding excitations (spin, heat, plasma, polarization waves), which do not exist separately and were imagined by theoretists to consistently describe properties of solids and liquids.

Most relevant terminology can be found in the following Wikipedia articles and their links:

- Discoveries of the chemical elements
- Elementary particle
- Quasiparticle
- List of quasiparticles
- Subatomic particle

(The word plasmon was well-known around the 1900s for a proprietary dried milk manufactured by the International Plasmon Company, which was added to a number of products to make Plasmon Oats, Plasmon Cocoa, and Plasmon Biscuits. Plasmon Biscuits were a popular snack used by Ernest Shackleton in his Antarctic Expedition of 1902.)

== Classical and non-vernacular terms and expressions ==
In modern science and its applied fields such as technology and medicine, a knowledge of classical languages is not as rigid a prerequisite as it used to be. However, traces of their influence remain. Firstly, languages such as Greek, Latin and Arabic – either directly or via more recently derived languages such as French – have provided not only most of the technical terms used in Western science, but also a de facto vocabulary of roots, prefixes and suffixes for the construction of new terms as required. Echoes of the consequences sound in remarks such as "Television? The word is half Latin and half Greek. No good can come of it." (referring to it being a hybrid word).

A special class of terminology that overwhelmingly is derived from classical sources, is biological classification, in which binomial nomenclature still is most often based on classical origins. The derivations are arbitrary however and can be mixed variously with modernisms, late Latin, and even fictional roots, errors and whims. However, in spite of the chaotic nature of the field, it still is helpful to the biologist to have a good vocabulary of classical roots.

Branches of science that are based on ancient fields of study, or that were established by scientists familiar with Greek and Latin, often use terminology that is fairly correct descriptive Latin, or occasionally Greek. Descriptive human anatomy or works on biological morphology often use such terms, for example, musculus gluteus maximus simply means the "largest rump muscle", where musculus was the Latin for "little mouse" and the name applied to muscles. During the last two centuries there has been an increasing tendency to modernise the terminology. In other descriptive anatomical terms, whether in vertebrates or invertebrates, a frenum (a structure for keeping something in place) is simply the Latin for a bridle; and a foramen (a passage or perforation) also is the actual Latin word.

=== Latin, its current relevance or convenience ===
There is no definite limit to how sophisticated a level of Latin may be brought to bear in conventional scientific terminology; such convention dates back to the days when nearly all standard communications in such subjects were written in Latin as an international scientific lingua franca. That was not so long ago; from the latter days of the Roman empire, Classical Latin had become the dominant language in learned, civil, diplomatic, legal, and religious communication in many states in Europe. Even after Latin had lost its status as a vernacular, Medieval or Late Latin increasingly became the de facto lingua franca in educated circles during the establishment of the Holy Roman Empire. The peak of the dominance of Latin in such contexts probably was during the Renaissance, but the language only began to lose favour for such purposes in the eighteenth century, and gradually at that. The presence of Latin terms in modern writing is largely the residue of the terminology of old documents.

The expression of fine distinctions in academically correct Latin technical terminology may well help in conveying intended meanings more flexibly and concisely, but the significance of the language need not always be taken seriously. An inspection of any collection of references will produce a range of very variable and dubious usages, and often a great deal of obsessive dispute. In contrast, the authoritative glossary attached to the textbook on Biological Nomenclature produced by the Systematics Association displays a very dismissive attitude to the question; for example, the only relevant entries it presents on the subject of the term sensu are:

sens. str.: see s.s.
sens. lat.: see s.l.
sensu amplo: see s.l.
s.l., sens. lat., sensu lato : Latin, in the broad sense; i.e. of a taxon, including all its subordinate taxa and/or other taxa sometimes considered as distinct.
s.s., sens. str., sensu stricto : Latin, in the strict sense, in the narrow sense, i.e. of a taxon, in the sense of the type of its name; or in the sense of its circumscription by its original describer; or in the sense of its nominate subordinate taxon (in the case of a taxon with 2 or more subordinate taxa); or with the exclusion of similar taxa sometimes united with it.

Such entries suggest that the Systematics Association is not concerned with hair-splitting in the use of the Latin terms.

In informal or non-technical English, to say "strictly speaking" for sensu stricto and "broadly speaking" and so on is valid. Even in formal writing, there is no formal requirement to use the Latin terms rather than the vernacular.

Valid reasons for using these Latin or partly Latin expressions are not points of pretentiousness; they include:

- Tradition: Where the terms and their abbreviations have been used formally for generations and appear repeatedly in records and textbooks in fixed contexts, it can be cumbersome and confusing to change unexpectedly to more familiar English or other vernacular.
- Precision: Vernacular expressions that most nearly correspond to these terms in meaning, might also be understood in subtly or even crashingly misleading senses, whereas the Latin terms are used according to strict conventions that are not easy to mistake in professional circles familiar with the usages.
- Efficiency: Not only are these terms compact (even in comparison to say, broadly speaking and strictly speaking) but in the proper contexts they lend themselves to understandable abbreviation as s.s. and s.l., better than the most compact vernacular expressions. In much the same way, think of etc or &c; practically everyone knows what those mean, and uses them unthinkingly, even people who do not know that they are abbreviations for et cetera or even et caetera, or that those mean "and the rest" in Latin. Even monoglot laymen would not usually trouble to write "and so on" instead of etc.

== Acronyms ==
A good example is the word laser, an acronym for "Light Amplification by Stimulated Emission of Radiation", and therefore all its letters should be capitalized. However, because of frequent use, this acronym became a neologism, i.e., it has integrated into English and most other languages. Consequently, laser is commonly written in small letters. It has even produced secondary acronyms such as LASIK (Laser-ASsisted in Situ Keratomileusis). A related acronym and neologism maser (Microwave Amplification by Stimulated Emission of Radiation) is much less known. Nevertheless, it is commonly written in small letters. On the contrary, acronym SPASER (Surface Plasmon Amplification by Stimulated Emission of Radiation) is capitalized.

Many scientific acronyms or abbreviations reflect the artistic sense of their creators, e.g.,

- AMANDA – Antarctic Muon And Neutrino Detector Array, a neutrino telescope
- BLAST – Balloon-borne Large Aperture Submillimeter Telescope
- COMICS – COoled Mid-Infrared Camera and Spectrometer
- FROG - Frequency-resolved optical gating
- MARVEL – Multi-object Apache Point Observatory Radial Velocity Exoplanet Large-area Survey, a NASA-funded project to search for exoplanets
- METATOY – METAmaTerial fOr raYs – a material that changes the direction of transmitted light rays
- PLANET – Probing Lensing Anomalies NETwork, a program to search for microlensing events
- SCREAM – Single Crystal Reactive Etch And Metallization, a process used in making some microelectromechanical systems (MEMS)
- SHRIMP – Sensitive High-Resolution Ion MicroProbe
- SIESTA – Spanish Initiative for Electronic Simulations with Thousands of Atoms (siesta = afternoon nap in Spanish)
- SPIDER – Spectral Phase Interferometry for Direct Electric-field Reconstruction
- SQUID – Superconducting Quantum Interference Device,

etc. (see also List of astronomy acronyms).

== See also ==
- Abbreviations
- Acronym
- Anacronym
- Backronym
- International scientific vocabulary
- Jargon
- List of deprecated terms for diseases
- Mathematical jargon
- Medical slang
- Medical terminology
- Neologism
- Portmanteau
- Retronym
