= Hladký =

Hladký (feminine Hladká) is a Czech surname meaning "smooth". Notable people with the surname include:

- Anne-Christine Hladky (born 1965), French materials scientist
- Josef Hladký (born 1962), Czech swimmer
- Kip Hladky (born 1960), Canadian field hockey player
- Václav Hladký (born 1990), Czech footballer

== See also ==
- Hladki
- Gladki
- Hladkyy
