= Mechanical metamaterial =

Mechanical metamaterials are metamaterials derived from their unique internal structures rather than the materials from which they are made. Inspiration for mechanical metamaterials design often comes from biological materials (such as honeycombs and cells), from molecular and crystalline unit cell structures as well as the artistic fields of origami and kirigami. While early mechanical metamaterials had regular repeats of simple unit cell structures, increasingly complex units and architectures are now being explored. Mechanical metamaterials can be seen as a counterpart to optical metamaterials and electromagnetic metamaterials. Mechanical metamaterials are the broad umbrella term, defined by architected structures at nano, micro, meso, and macro scales that produce properties unattainable in conventional materials. Mechanical properties, including elasticity, viscoelasticity, thermoelasticity, and thermal conductivity, are key design targets in mechanical metamaterials.

Three main types of mechanical metamaterials can be distinguished. The first involves static or quasi-static responses, such as auxeticity, tunable stiffness, multistability, or programmable deformation. The second involves dynamic wave phenomena in solids, often referred to as elastic or elastodynamic metamaterials, where resonant or periodic architectures control both longitudinal and shear wave propagation through effective properties such as negative mass density or modulus. Acoustic metamaterials fall within this dynamic branch and are designed to control longitudinal pressure waves in fluids as well as in solids where shear effects are negligible, through tailored effective density and bulk modulus. The third branch encompasses thermal metamaterials, which manipulate heat conduction and diffusion. These are considered mechanical metamaterials because their unusual thermal responses arise from engineered architecture rather than composition, enabling anisotropic conduction, thermal cloaking, and directional heat management using structures such as aligned fibers or carbon nanotube arrays. Mainstream research on mechanical metamaterials has focused on static and quasi-static properties that can be designed to take values not found in nature, such as negative stiffness, negative Poisson's ratio, negative compressibility, and vanishing shear modulus.

== Classical mechanical metamaterials ==
3D printing, or additive manufacturing, has revolutionized the field in the past decade by enabling the fabrication of intricate mechanical metamaterial structures. Some of the unprecedented and unusual properties of classical mechanical metamaterials include:

=== Negative Poisson's ratio (auxetics) ===
Poisson's ratio defines how a material expands (or contracts) transversely when being compressed longitudinally. While most natural materials have a positive Poisson's ratio (coinciding with our intuitive idea that by compressing a material, it must expand in the orthogonal direction), a family of extreme materials known as auxetic materials can exhibit Poisson's ratios below zero. Examples of these can be found in nature, or fabricated, and often consist of a low-volume microstructure that grants the extreme properties. Simple designs of composites possessing negative Poisson's ratio (inverted hexagonal periodicity cell) were published in 1985. In addition, certain origami folds such as the Miura fold and, in general, zigzag-based folds are also known to exhibit negative Poisson's ratio.

=== Negative stiffness ===
Negative stiffness (NS) mechanical metamaterials are engineered structures that exhibit a counterintuitive property: as an external force is applied, the material deforms in a way that reduces the applied force rather than increasing it. This is in contrast to conventional materials that resist deformation. NS metamaterials are typically constructed from periodically arranged elements that undergo elastic instability under load. This instability leads to a negative stiffness behavior within a specific deformation range. The overall effect is a material that can absorb energy more efficiently and exhibit unique mechanical properties compared to traditional materials.

=== Negative thermal expansion ===
These mechanical metamaterials can exhibit coefficients of thermal expansion larger than that of either constituent. The expansion can be arbitrarily large positive or arbitrarily large negative, or zero. These materials substantially exceed the bounds for thermal expansion of a two-phase composite. They contain considerable void space.

=== High strength to density ratio ===
A high strength-to-density ratio mechanical metamaterial is a synthetic material engineered to possess exceptional mechanical properties relative to its weight. This is achieved through carefully designed internal microstructures, often periodic or hierarchical, which contribute to the material's overall performance.

=== Negative compressibility ===
In a closed thermodynamic system in equilibrium, both the longitudinal and volumetric compressibility are necessarily non-negative because of stability constraints. For this reason, when tensioned, ordinary materials expand along the direction of the applied force. It has been shown, however, that metamaterials can be designed to exhibit negative compressibility transitions, during which the material undergoes contraction when tensioned (or expansion when pressured). When subjected to isotropic stresses, these metamaterials also exhibit negative volumetric compressibility transitions. In this class of metamaterials, the negative response is along the direction of the applied force, which distinguishes these materials from those that exhibit negative transversal response (such as in the study of negative Poisson's ratio).

=== Negative bulk modulus ===
Mechanical metamaterials with negative effective bulk modulus exhibit intriguing and counterintuitive properties. Unlike conventional materials that compress under pressure, these materials expand. This anomalous behavior stems from their carefully engineered microstructure, which allows for internal deformation mechanisms that counteract the applied stress. Potential applications for these materials are vast. They could be employed to design acoustic or phononic metamaterials, advanced shock absorbers, and energy dissipation systems. Furthermore, their unique elastic properties may find utility in creating novel structural components with enhanced resilience and adaptability to dynamic loads.

=== Vanishing shear modulus ===
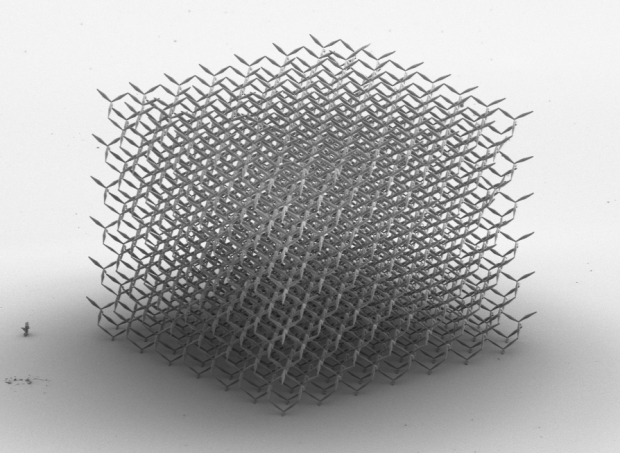
SEM image of a pentamode metamaterial (with a size of roughly 300μm)

A pentamode metamaterial is an artificial three-dimensional structure which, despite being a solid, ideally behaves like a fluid. Thus, it has a finite bulk but vanishing shear modulus, or in other words it is hard to compress yet easy to deform. Speaking in a more mathematical way, pentamode metamaterials have an elasticity tensor with only one non-zero eigenvalue and five (penta) vanishing eigenvalues. Pentamode structures have been proposed theoretically by Graeme Milton and Andrej Cherkaev in 1995 but have not been fabricated until early 2012. According to theory, pentamode metamaterials can be used as the building blocks for materials with completely arbitrary elastic properties. Anisotropic versions of pentamode structures are a candidate for transformation elastodynamics and elastodynamic cloaking.

=== Chiral micropolar elasticity ===
Very often Cauchy elasticity is sufficient to describe the effective behavior of mechanical metamaterials. When the unit cells of typical metamaterials are not centrosymmetric it has been shown that an effective description using chiral micropolar elasticity (or Cosserat) was required. Micropolar elasticity combines the coupling of translational and rotational degrees of freedom in the static case and shows an equivalent behavior to the optical activity.

=== Infinite mechanical tunability ===
In addition to the well-known unprecedented mechanical properties of mechanical metamaterials, "infinite mechanical tunability" is another crucial aspect of mechanical metamaterials. This is particularly important for structural materials as their microstructure and stiffness can be tuned to effectively achieve theoretical upper bounds for specific stiffness and strength. While theoretical composites that achieve the same upper bound have existed for some time, they have been impractical to fabricate as they require features on multiple length scales. Single length scale designs are amenable to additive manufacturing, where they can enable engineered systems that maximize lightweight stiffness, strength and energy absorption.

== Active Mechanical Metamaterials ==
To date, most mainstream studies on mechanical metamaterials have focused on passive structures with fixed properties, lacking active sensing or feedback capabilities. Deep integration of advanced functionalities is a critical challenge in exploring the next generation of metamaterials. Composite mechanical metamaterials could be the key to achieving this goal. However, the entire concept of composite mechanical metamaterials is still in its infancy. Obtaining programmable behavior through the interplay between material and structure in composite mechanical metamaterials enables integrating advanced functionalities into their texture beyond their mechanical properties. The "mechanical metamaterial tree of knowledge" implies that chiral, lattice and negative metamaterials (e.g., negative bulk modulus or negative elastic modulus) are ripe followed by origami and cellular metamaterials.

Recent research trends have been entering a space beyond merely exploring unprecedented mechanical properties. Emerging directions envisioned are sensing, energy harvesting, and actuating mechanical metamaterials.The tree of knowledge reveals that digital computing, digital data storage, and micro/nano-electromechanical systems (MEMS/NEMS) applications are one of the pillars of the mechanical metamaterials future research. Along this direction of evolution, the final target can be active mechanical metamaterials with a level of cognition. Cognitive abilities are crucial elements in a truly "intelligent mechanical metamaterials". Similar to complex living organisms, intelligent mechanical metamaterials can potentially deploy their cognitive abilities for sensing, self-powering, and information processing to interact with the surrounding environments, optimizing their response, and creating a sense–decide–respond loop.

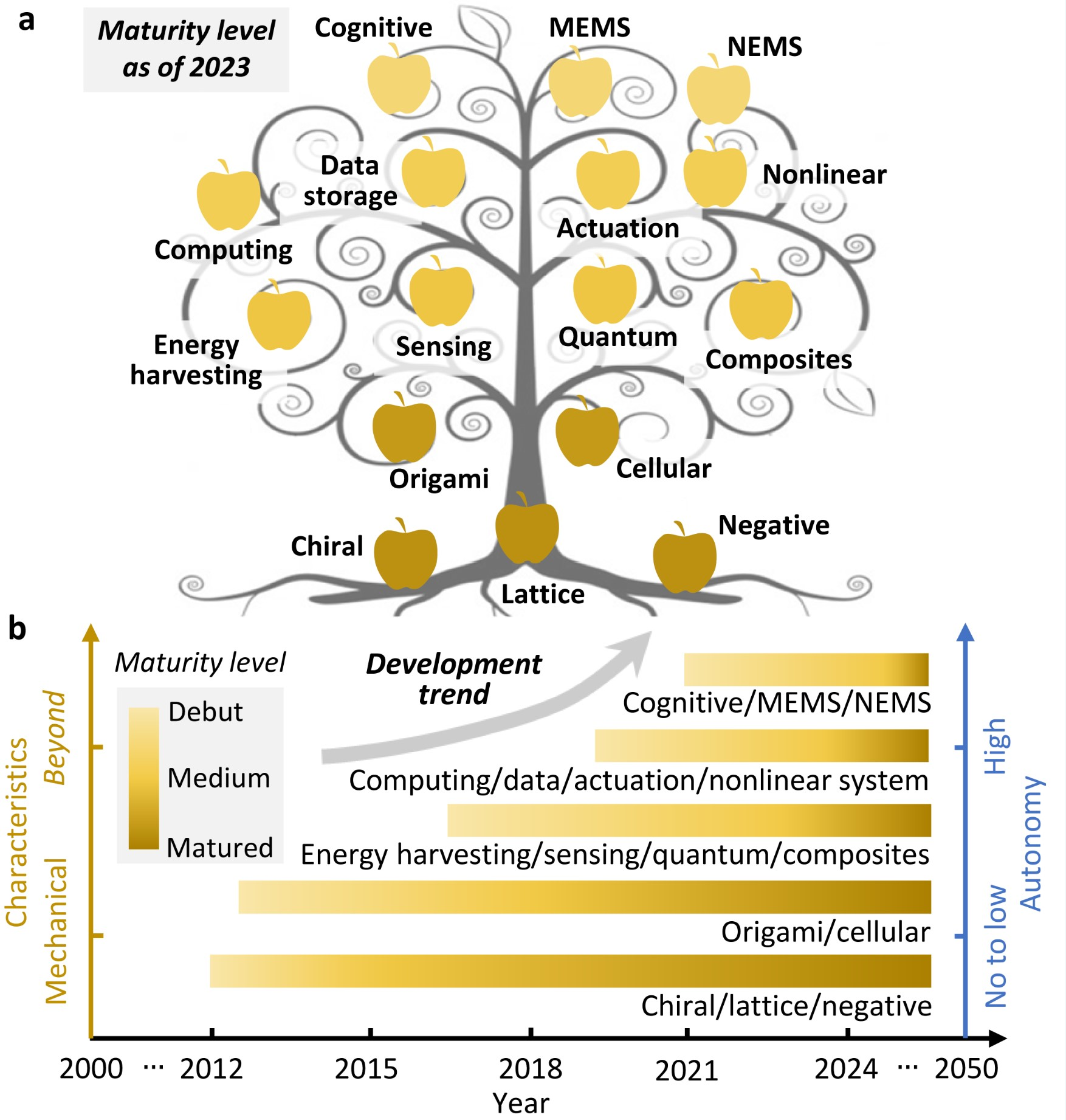
Mechanical metamaterial tree of knowledge

=== Programmable mechanical metamaterials ===
Programmable response is an emerging direction for mechanical metamaterials beyond mechanical properties. Electrical responsiveness is an important functionality for designing adaptive, actuating, and autonomous mechanical metamaterials. For example, research ideas have been opened by active and adaptive mechanical metamaterials that design electrical materials into the microstructural units of metamaterials to autonomously convert mechanical-strain input into electrical-signal output.

=== Responsive mechanical metamaterials ===
Integrating functional materials and mechanical design is an emerging research area to explore responsive mechanical metamaterials. Recent studies explore new classes of mechanical metamaterials that can response to different excitation types such acoustic, thermophotovoltaic and magnetic.

=== Sensing and energy harvesting mechanical metamaterials ===
Recent studies have explored the integration of sensing and energy harvesting functionalities into the fabric of mechanical metamaterials. Meta-tribomaterials proposed in 2021 are a new class of multifunctional composite mechanical metamaterials with intrinsic sensing and energy harvesting functionalities. These material systems are composed of finely tailored and topologically different triboelectric microstructures. Meta-tribomaterials can serve as nanogenerators and sensing media to directly collect information about its operating environment. They naturally inherit the enhanced mechanical properties offered by classical mechanical metamaterials. Under mechanical excitations, meta-tribomaterials generate electrical signals which can be used for active sensing and empowering sensors and embedded electronics.

=== Electronic mechanical metamaterials ===
Electronic mechanical metamaterials are active mechanical metamaterials with digital computing and information storage capabilities. They have built the foundation for a new scientific field of meta-mechanotronics (mechanical metamaterial electronics) proposed in 2023. These material systems are created via integrating mechanical metamaterials, digital electronics and nano energy harvesting (e.g. triboelectric, piezoelectric, pyroelectric) technologies. Electronic mechanical metamaterials hold the potential to function as digital logic gates, paving the way for the development of mechanical metamaterial computers (MMCs) that could complement traditional electronic systems. Such computing metamaterial systems can be particularly useful under extreme loads and harsh environments (e.g. high pressure, high/low temperature and radiation exposure) where traditional semiconductor electronics cannot maintain their designed logical functions.
