= Mikhail Bogdanov =

Mikhail Bogdanov may refer to:

- Mikhail Bogdanov (artist) (1914–1995), Soviet production designer
- Mikhail Bogdanov (diplomat) (born 1952), Russian deputy foreign minister and representative to the Arab League
- Mikhail Bogdanov (revolutionary) (1881–1937), Russian revolutionary, briefly chairman of the Kiev Gubernatorial Committee of the Communist Party of Ukraine
- Mikhail Bogdanov (cossack) (18th century), a colonel of Chernihiv regiment (1723–1735) in Cossack Hetmanate
