= Hladki =

Hladki or Hładki is a surname. Polish and Sorbian language feminine form: Hładka. Notable people with this surname include:

- Jadwiga Hładki (1904–1944), Polish artist
- Janice Hladki, Canadian artist
- Zygmunt Hładki (1896–1984), Polish diplomat

== See also ==
- Hladký
- Gladki
- Hladkyy
