= Pierre Deymier =

Materials science researcher

Pierre A. Deymier
- Born: France
- Citizenship: USA, France
- Education: MIT, University of Montpellier
- Known for: Acoustic metamaterial, Materials science, Computational materials science
- Title: Professor of Materials Science & Engineering
- Scientific career
- Fields: Phononics, Acoustic metamaterial, Quantum computing, Materials science
- Workplaces: University of Arizona
- Doctoral advisor: Gretchen Kalonji
- Doctoral students: Frank J. Cherne, Vivek Kapila, Krishna Muralidharan, Javier Carmona, Jim Bucay, Nick Swinteck, Stefan Bringuier, Abdul-Jabar Alsayoud

Pierre A. Deymier is a researcher in phononics, acoustic metamaterial, and materials science. He is a Professor of Materials Science and Engineering and previously department head at the University of Arizona. He holds appointments with the applied mathematics graduate interdisciplinary program, BIO5 institute, and School of Sustainable Engineered Systems at the University of Arizona. More recently, he has proposed a novel approach akin to quantum computing using the properties of phonons rather than qubits, which he has dubbed "phi-bits" or "phase-bits".

Deymier is also the director for The New Frontiers of Sound Science and Technology Center focused on research and education in topological acoustics. The NewFoS aims to exploit the properties of sound in ways that could vastly improve computing, telecommunications and sensing. In 2025 the University of Arizona College of Engineering awarded Deymier the Da Vinci Fellowship for his significant career and contributions to the university.

== Biography ==
=== Education ===
Deymier received his engineer's degree in materials science in 1982 from University of Montpellier in France and his Ph.D. in Materials Science & Engineering from MIT in 1985. His dissertation research was focused on computational materials science. He became assistant professor of materials science & engineering at the University of Arizona in 1985.

=== Personal life ===
Deymier grew up in Carpentras, France. His daughter, Alix Deymier, is a professor of biomedical engineering at the University of Connecticut.

== Publications ==
Deymier has published over 228 peer-reviewed publications. Some of his most highly cited works are:

1. Deymier, P. A.(Ed.). (2013). Acoustic metamaterials and phononic crystals (Vol. 173). Springer Science & Business Media. (Cited 714 times, according to Google Scholar)
2. Vasseur, J. O., Deymier, P. A.. Chenni, B., Djafari-Rouhani, B., Dobrzynski, L., & Prevost, D. (2001). Experimental and theoretical evidence for the existence of absolute acoustic band gaps in two-dimensional solid phononic crystals. Physical Review Letters, 86(14), 3012. (open access) (Cited 574 times, according to Google Scholar.)
3. Sukhovich A, Merheb B, Muralidharan K, Vasseur JO, Pennec Y, Deymier PA, Page JH. Experimental and theoretical evidence for subwavelength imaging in phononic crystals. Physical review letters. 2009 Apr 17;102(15):154301 (open access) (Cited 314 times, according to Google Scholar.)
4. Pennec Y, Vasseur JO, Djafari-Rouhani B, Dobrzyński L, Deymier PA. Two-dimensional phononic crystals: Examples and applications. Surface Science Reports. 2010 Aug 31;65(8):229-91. (Cited 491 times, according to Google Scholar.)
5. Vasseur, J. O., Deymier, P. A. Djafari-Rouhani, B., Pennec, Y., & Hladky-Hennion, A. C. (2008). Absolute forbidden bands and waveguiding in two-dimensional phononic crystal plates. Physical Review B, 77(8), 085415. (open access) (Cited 307 times, according to Google Scholar.)

== Awards ==
- Felix Bloch Award, 2023, International Phononics Society. The prize honors individuals who have made “outstanding and sustained contributions in the field of phononics”.
