= Evening Kyiv =

Daily newspaper in Kyiv, Ukraine

- Front page on 19 November 2015. The main headline is "How we fought for a European choice", commemorating the anniversary of the Euromaidan protests.
- Type: Online newspaper (2019–present); Weekly newspaper (1990s); Daily newspaper (until 2019, 2024–present)
- Format: Tabloid (until 2018, 2024–present)
- Owners: Borys Grinchenko Kyiv Metropolitan University (since 2024); Kyiv City Council (until 1990, 2000–2018); Vitalii Karpenko (1990–2000); Kyiv City Committee of the Communist Party of Ukraine (until 1990)
- Founded: 6 January 1906 (as The Evening Gazette); 1 March 1927 (as Evening Kyiv)
- Relaunched: 1932; 1951; 25 April 2024
- Political alignment: Centre-right (Note: Historically far-left until the late 1980s.)
- Language: Ukrainian (Note: Published in Russian until 1932, and simultaneously in Russian and Ukrainian from 1983.)
- City: Kyiv
- Country: Ukraine
- Website: vechirniy.kyiv.ua

The Evening Kyiv (Ukrainian: «Вечірній Київ», romanized: Vechirnii Kyiv, pronounced [weˈtʃirn⁽ʲ⁾ij ˈkɪjiu̯]) is a daily newspaper published in Kyiv, Ukraine since 1927, having previously been published as The Evening Gazette in 1906 and from 1913 to 1917. The newspaper is owned by Borys Grinchenko Kyiv Metropolitan University. Although it was once frequently regarded a mouthpiece for Soviet propaganda, the newspaper has been independent since the 1991 dissolution of the Soviet Union and is now regarded as a credible centre-right newspaper. It is Kyiv's oldest newspaper and an important part of the culture of Kyiv, where it is popularly known as Vechirka (Ukrainian: Вечірка).

Over its history, Evening Kyiv has faced several threats from various governments, including a reduction in published issues at the height of Volodymyr Shcherbytsky's rule and efforts by mayor Leonid Chernovetskyi to influence editorial positions. It has been closed and reopened on several occasions for various reasons, the most recent of both being 2018 and 2024, respectively.

== History ==
=== The Evening Gazette (1906–1917) ===
Evening Kyiv has its roots in the emergence of evening newspapers throughout the Russian Empire during the early 20th century. The first issue of The Evening Gazette (Russian: Вечерняя газета, romanized: Vechernyaya gazeta; Ukrainian: Вечірна газета, romanized: Vechirna hazeta), a Kyiv-based evening newspaper, was published on 6 January 1906, although it was confiscated by the Russian police immediately after publication due to references to the ongoing Russian Revolution of 1905. The newspaper was forcibly disbanded following the confiscations, and it only was able to resume operations in 1913, on the eve of World War I. The newspaper continued active publication, detailing the local city life, until the 1917 Russian Revolution, when it was replaced by several evening newspapers inspired by The Evening Gazette's informal style and evening newspaper status. The Gazette is described by Evening Kyiv as its first incarnation, and the newspaper celebrates its anniversary as January 1906.

=== 1927 re-establishment, Bilshovyk, and 1939 closure ===
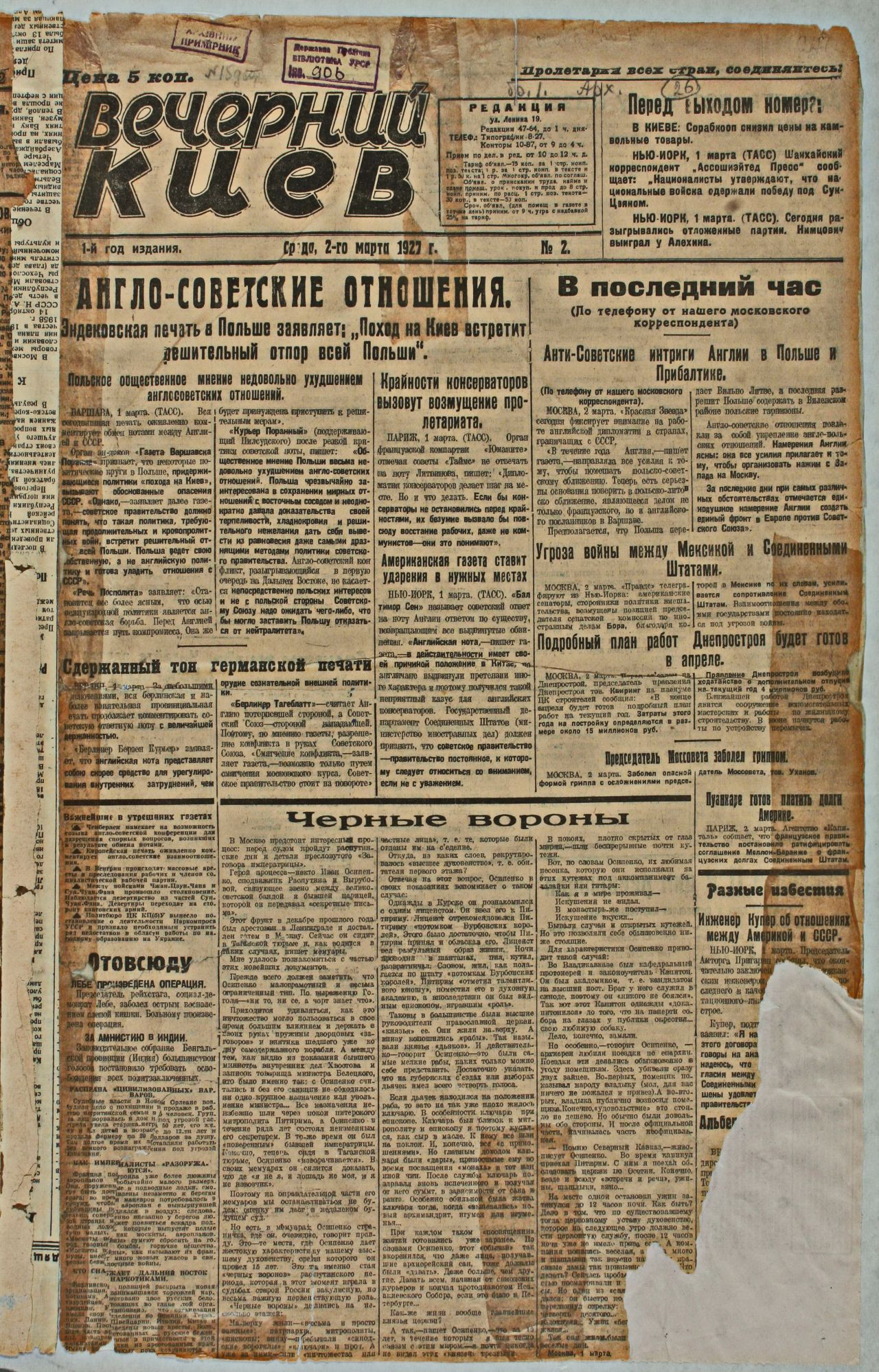
The front page of Evening Kyiv on 2 March 1927.

Evening Kyiv was refounded under its current name on 1 March 1927. This time, it was an organ of the Kyiv City Council, part of the communist Soviet government of the city. At the time, it was printed in the Russian language. The renewed Evening Kyiv would not last long, either; it was dissolved in 1930 and reestablished two years later under the name Bilshovyk (Ukrainian: Більшовик), which was written in the Ukrainian language. The latter newspaper was an organ of the Kyiv City Committee of the Communist Party of Ukraine, and it survived until 1939, when it, too, came to an end.

=== 1951 reestablishment and usage as a mouthpiece ===
The Ukrainian-language version of Evening Kyiv was established on 1 June 1951 as part of the Kyiv City Committee. The renewed Evening Kyiv rapidly built up its stature as a leading Ukrainian newspaper, with a pressrun of 100,000 by 1960. This newfound status led the newspaper to include more ideologically-minded statements, and Evening Kyiv in this period has since been described as a "Soviet mouthpiece" by the United States-funded Radio Free Europe/Radio Liberty. From the 1960s until the 1980s, Soviet dissidents like Viacheslav Chornovil and human rights activists such as Anna Procyk of Amnesty International were regularly condemned, with the latter being accused of being supported by Ukrainian nationalists and Zionists. The newspaper supported the 1972–1973 Ukrainian purge.

In the late 1970s, Evening Kyiv came under increased pressure from the government of Ukraine's First Secretary, Volodymyr Shcherbytsky. Shcherbytsky, who oversaw a wide-reaching campaign of Russification, reduced the newspaper's pressrun from a peak of 367,000 in 1975 to 200,000. The pressrun was further reduced to 188,500 in 1983, after the introduction of a parallel Russophone edition of Evening Kyiv. The Russophone edition gradually consumed a greater amount of Evening Kyiv's pressrun until 1989, when it reached a low of 130,000 in Ukrainian compared to 330,000 in Russian.

=== Editorial independence (1990–2000) ===
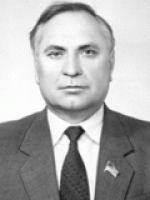
Vitalii Karpenko purchased Evening Kyiv in 1990

At the beginning of Mikhail Gorbachev's Perestroika reforms, Evening Kyiv remained close to the Soviet government position, continuing to publicly attack human rights activists such as Chornovil. However, as Perestroika continued, the newspaper became one of the first to adopt a more pro-democratic outlook, along with Literary Ukraine and Komsomol Banner. It began to gain increased popularity among Ukrainians during this period, becoming one of the most popular newspapers in Ukraine. In 1990, Evening Kyiv was purchased by Vitalii Karpenko, a People's Deputy of Ukraine from the anti-communist, pro-independence Democratic Bloc faction who was a journalist at the newspaper. From 1990 to 1999, Evening Kyiv also published the Evening Kyiv Library, which shared high-profile literature.

The changes to the newspaper in the 1990s established Evening Kyiv as an important part of the culture of Kyiv and Ukrainian politics as a whole. In 1995, the newspaper had a circulation of 600,000 copies per day. Facing financial difficulties, however, the paper returned to the Kyiv City Council in 2000 in a successful effort to return to daily publication.

=== Conflicts with Kyiv city government (2000s) ===
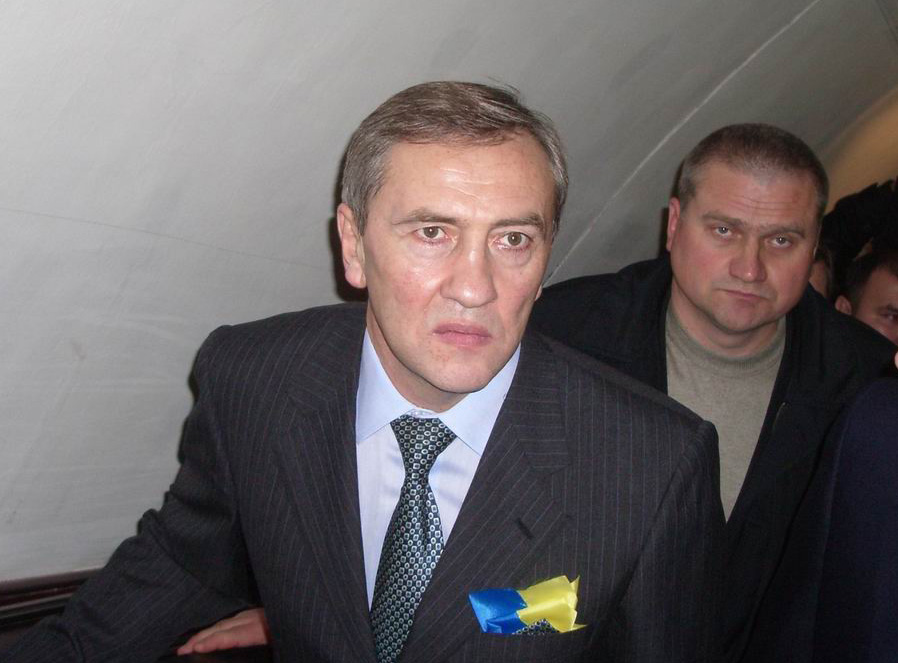
Mayor Leonid Chernovetskyi attempted to force Evening Kyiv to write more favourable coverage of his administration

On 22 December 2006, mayor Leonid Chernovetskyi announced the dismissal of Liudmyla Vorobiova, chief editor of Evening Kyiv, and her replacement with Svitlana Syniakova. The dismissal came two months after Vorobiova had publicly complained that the government of Kyiv was exerting pressure on the newspaper to write more favourable coverage, and a day after People's Deputy of Ukraine Andriy Shevchenko held a press conference with Vorobiova on the matter. Several journalists from the newspaper had also called on the Kyiv City Council to agree not to involve itself in the work of its press organs prior to the dismissal. The Ukrainian Helsinki Group, a non-governmental organisation, rejected Chernovetskyi's moves as unlawful, and the Institute for Mass Information and Ukrainian Independent Media Trade Union, two media watchdogs, named the mayor as enemy of the press of the year in 2006.

In May 2007, the newspaper faced another challenge, this time from newly installed chief editor Roman Kostrytsa. Kostryts attempted to relocate the offices of the editorial staff from Marshal Grechko Street to the offices of the Khreshchatyk newspaper, also controlled by the Kyiv City Council. Kostrytsa justified his move by noting that the lease was to expire in July 2007, although the Institute for Mass Information argued that it was likely to be renewed due to the status of the newspaper as a communal enterprise. In response to the attempted move of the newspaper, the editors' union voted to dismiss Kostrytsa, claiming that he had violated Article 45 of the Labour Code of Ukraine. The majority of the editorial staff refused to relocate, in defiance of Kostrytsa and Chernovetskyi.

=== Closure and current status ===
In the 2010s, Evening Kyiv found itself in a conflict with Vesti, a newspaper owned by Russian oligarch Alisher Usmanov. Vesti pursued a strategy of distributing thousands of copies to people at stations on the Kyiv Metro for free, operating at a loss. This was possible due to Usmanov's significant assets in other fields. At the same time, Evening Kyiv faced a significant decline in quality and popularity, with only five of eleven pages per issue being devoted to news. Kostrytsa, still serving as chief editor and having by this point removed most of his opponents from the paper, was uninterested in the problems of Kyiv, instead reprinting content from the internet.

In 2018, the newspaper's closure was announced by the Kyiv City Council after the Verkhovna Rada (parliament of Ukraine) passed the Draft Law on the Reformation of State and Communal Printed Media. Khreshchatyk was also closed at the same time. The two newspapers were officially closed on 1 January 2019. While Khreshchatyk fully shuttered its operations, however, Evening Kyiv continued to exist as a purely-online newspaper.

With the beginning of the Russian invasion of Ukraine in 2022, Evening Kyiv acquired greater importance, and the number of articles published grew from 30 to 35 per day to 70–80. According to the newspaper's chief editor, Yevhen Lopushinskyi, daily readership increased from half a million to three million following the beginning of the invasion. The newspaper resumed publication as a printed newspaper on 7 June 2024 after being acquired by Borys Grinchenko Kyiv Metropolitan University. The new editorial board comprised established Ukrainian journalists, as well as students at the university.
