= Gladki =

Gladki or Gładki is a surname. Notable people with the surname include:

- Dimitri Gladki (1911–1959), Soviet politician
- Piotr Gładki (1972–2005), Polish long-distance runner

== See also ==
- Hladki
- Hladky, Czech and Ukrainian cognate
