= Kyiv Regional Committee of the Communist Party of Ukraine =

Highest official in Kyiv Oblast, Ukrainian SSR

The Kyiv Regional Committee of the Communist Party of Ukraine, commonly referred to as the Kyiv CPU obkom, was the position of highest authority in Kyiv Oblast during most of the existence of the Soviet Union. The position was created on 27 February 1932, and abolished in August 1991 although most authority was lost in June that year to the position of Governor of Kyiv Oblast. The First Secretary was a de facto appointed position usually by the Central Committee the Communist Party of Ukraine or the First Secretary of the Republic.

== First Secretaries ==
The following individuals served as first secretaries of the Kyiv Regional Committee of the Communist Party of Ukraine.

Name	Term of Office		Life years
Name	Start	End	Life years
Nikolai Demchenko	27 February 1932	10 June 1934	1896–1937
Pavel Postyshev	10 June 1934	16 January 1937	1887–1939
Sergei Kudryavtsev	16 January 1937	September 1937	1903–1938
Dmitriy Yevtushenko (Note: Acting)	September 1937	17 April 1938	1898–1938
Nikita Khrushchev (Note: Acting to 31 May 1938)	17 April 1938	1941	1894–1971
Nazi German occupation (1941–1943)
Nikita Khrushchev	1943	22 March 1947	1894–1971
Zynoviy Serdyuk	22 March 1947	February 1949	1903–1982
Aleksei Gryza	February 1949	December 1952	1907–1969
Grigoriy Grishko	December 1952	1 February 1957	1906–1959
Petr Shelest	1 February 1957	16 August 1962	1908–1996
Vasiliy Drozdenko (Note: For Industry January 1963 – December 1964)	16 August 1962	24 March 1966	1924–1982
Ivan Stafiychuk (Note: For Agriculture)	1963	December 1964	1912–?
Fedor Golovchenko	24 March 1966	April 1970	1918–
Vladimir Tsybulko	April 1970	4 November 1985	1924–1987
Grigoriy Revenko	4 November 1985	2 April 1990	1936–
Anatoliy Kikot	2 April 1990	August 1991	1940–

== See also ==
- Governor of Kyiv Oblast
- Kyiv City Committee of the Communist Party of Ukraine
- Kyiv Gubernatorial Committee of the Communist Party of Ukraine

== Sources ==
- World Statesmen.org
