= Kyiv Gubernatorial Committee of the Communist Party of Ukraine =

The Kiev Gubernatorial Committee of the Communist Party of Ukraine, commonly referred to as the Kiev CPU gubkom. In 1917 it was preceded by Kiev Military Revolutionary Committee of Bolsheviks and in 1918-1921 as Kiev Gubernatorial Revolutionary Committee.

The Kiev Milrevkom was created by Bolsheviks on 9 November 1917 as the Kiev Military Revolutionary Committee as part of 1917 Kiev Bolshevik Uprising which followed the Petrograd Bolshevik putsch. To keep the order in the city and region, the Central Council of Ukraine which was granted a self-rule over Ukraine by the Russian Provisional Government created the Regional Committee in Protection of Revolution in Ukraine and allowed to participate all political faction of the city and governorate. At the same time the Central Council of Ukraine had its own Gubernatorial Commissars in each governorate.

The post was finally established in the summer of 1919 and existed along with the revolutionary committee until 1921.

With elimination of the governorate division in 1925, the committee ceased to exist and was replaced by the Kiev District (Okruha) Committee.

== Chairmen ==
The following individuals served as chairpersons of the Kiev Milrevkom, Kiev Revkom and Kiev Gubernatorial Committee.

=== Kiev Military Revolutionary Committee (1917) ===
Name	Term of Office		Life years
Name	Start	End	Life years
Leonid Pyatakov	9 November 1917	10 November 1917	1890-1937
Mikhail Bogdanov	10 November 1917	14 November 1917	1881–1937
Leonid Pyatakov	14 November 1917	12 December 1917	1890-1937

=== Kiev Revolutionary Committee (1918-1921) ===
Name	Term of Office		Life years
Name	Start	End	Life years
Andrei Bubnov	October 1918	25 February 1919	1883–1938
Yakov Muravnik	1919	1919	1895–1937
Dmitry Manuilsky	19 December 1919	December 1919	1883–1959
Andriy Ivanov	December 1919	17 July 1920	1888–1927
Mikhail Vetoshkin	17 July 1920	18 October 1920	1884–1958
Yan Gamarnik	18 October 1920	July 1921	1894–1937

=== Kiev Gubernatorial Committee (1918-1920) ===
Name	Term of Office		Life years
Name	Start	End	Life years
Yakov Yakovlev	July 1919	August 1919	1896–1938
Abram Glinski	1919	1920	1897–1939
Ivan Klymenko	1920	1920	1891–1937

== Executive Secretaries ==
=== Kiev Gubernatorial Committee (1920-1925) ===
Name	Term of Office		Life years
Name	Start	End	Life years
Panas Lyubchenko	1920	1920	1897–1937
Yan Gamarnik	6 July 1920	1920	1894–1937
Aleksandr Odintsov	1920	1921	1895–1937
Nikolai Golubenko	1921	1921	1897–1937
Lavrentiy Kartvelishvili	1921	1923	1890–1938
Vladimir Loginov	1923	August 1923	1897–1937
Juozas Vareikis	August 1923	February 1924	1894–1938
Lavrentiy Kartvelishvili	February 1924	13 November 1924	1890–1938
Pavel Postyshev	13 November 1924	1925	1887–1939

== Districts ==
In 1923 the Ukrainian SSR was split into okruhas (not to be confused with okrugs).

The Kiev Governorate was initially split into 7 okruhas centered in following cities: Bila Tserkva, Berdychiv, Kiev, Malyn, Uman, Cherkasy, and Korsun (as Shevchenko Okruha).

=== Kiev District Committee (1925-1930) ===
Name	Term of Office		Life years
Name	Start	End	Life years
Pavel Postyshev	1925	November 1926	1887–1939
Fyodor Kornyushin	November 1926	March 1928	1893–1938
Nikolai Demchenko	March 1928	1930	1896–1937
Vladimir Chernyavski	1930	September 1930	1893–1937

=== Bila Tserkva District Committee (1925-1930) ===
Name	Term of Office		Life years
Name	Start	End	Life years
Mikhail Postolovsky	1925	1926	1900–1937
S. Gvozdetsky	1927	1927	?–?
Mark Vasilenko	June 1928	December 1928	1895–1937
P. Lazarko	1929	?	?–?
Vasiliy Pidsukha	?	1930	1899–?

== See also ==
- Administrative divisions of Ukraine (1918–1925)
- Governor of Kiev Oblast
- Kiev City Committee of the Communist Party of Ukraine
- Kiev Regional Committee of the Communist Party of Ukraine
