= Drohobych Regional Committee of the Communist Party of Ukraine =

The Drohobych Regional Committee of the Communist Party of Ukraine, commonly referred to as the Drohobych CPU obkom, was the position of highest authority in the Drohobych Oblast, in the Ukrainian SSR of the Soviet Union. The position was created in November 1939 following the 1939 Soviet invasion of Poland during the ongoing World War II and abolished on 21 May 1959. On 21 May 1959 the Drohobych Regional Committee was merged into the Lviv Regional Committee.

The First Secretary was a de facto appointed position usually by the Central Committee of the Communist Party of Ukraine or the First Secretary of the Republic.

== List of First Secretaries of the Communist Party of Drohobych ==
Name	Term of Office		Life years
Name	Start	End	Life years
First Secretaries of the Oblast Committee of the Communist Party
? (provisional administration of the Lwow Voivodeship)	September 1939	November 1939	
Yakiv Tkach	November 27, 1939	June 1941	1906–1941
part of the General Governorate District Galizien	1941	1944	
Stepan Oleksenko	May 1944	December 1946	1904–1976
Ivan Horobets (acting to 1947)	December 1946	September 26, 1949	1909–????
Stepan Oleksenko	September 26, 1949	September 9, 1952	1904–1976
Dmytro Hapiy	September 9, 1952	June 1956	1905–????
Vladimir Druzhynin	June 1956	May 21, 1959	1907–1976

== See also ==
- Drohobych Oblast

== Sources ==
- World Statesmen.org
