= Lviv Regional Committee of the Communist Party of Ukraine =

The Lviv Regional Committee of the Communist Party of Ukraine, commonly referred to as the Lviv CPU obkom, was the position of highest authority in the Lviv Oblast, in the Ukrainian SSR of the Soviet Union. The position was created in November 1939 following the 1939 Soviet invasion of Poland during the ongoing World War II and abolished in August 1991. On 21 May 1959 the Drohobych Regional Committee was merged into the Lviv Regional Committee.

The First Secretary was a de facto appointed position usually by the Central Committee of the Communist Party of Ukraine or the First Secretary of the Republic.

== List of First Secretaries of the Communist Party of Lviv ==
Name	Term of Office		Life years
Name	Start	End	Life years
First Secretaries of the Oblast Committee of the Communist Party
? (provisional administration of the Lwow Voivodeship)	September 1939	November 1939	
Leonid Hryshchuk	November 27, 1939	June 1941	1906–1960
part of the General Governorate District of Galicia	1941	1944	
Ivan Hrushetsky	1944	January 10, 1949	1904–1982
Borys Koval	January 12, 1949	January 6, 1950	1903–1959
Ivan Hrushetsky	January 6, 1950	February 15, 1951	1904–1982
Vasyl Chuchukalo	February 17, 1951	April 4, 1952	1905–1963
Zinovie Serdiuk	April 15, 1952	February 9, 1954	1903–1982
Mykhailo Lazurenko	February 9, 1954	February 11, 1961	1908–1987
Ivan Hrushetsky	February 11, 1961	December 17, 1962	1904–1982
Vasyl Kutsevol (Note: Also as Industrial in 9 Jan 1963 - 14 Dec 1964)	December 17, 1962	November 28, 1973	1920–2001
Leonid Vandenko (agricultural)	January 11, 1963	December 14, 1964	1913–1987
Viktor Dobryk	November 28, 1973	March 20, 1987	1927–2008
Yakiv Pohrebnyak	March 20, 1987	April 14, 1990	1928–2016
Vyacheslav Secretariuk	April 14, 1990	August 26, 1991	1938–2004

== See also ==
- Lviv Oblast
- Governor of Lviv Oblast

== Sources ==
- World Statesmen.org
