= Kiev City Committee of the Communist Party of Ukraine =

The Kyiv City Committee of the Communist Party of Ukraine, commonly referred to as the Kyiv CPU gorkom, was the position of highest authority in the city of Kyiv.

The position was created in 1921, and abolished in August 1991 although most authority was lost in June that year to the position of Mayor of Kyiv. The First Secretary was a de facto appointed position usually by the Central Committee of the Communist Party of Ukraine or the First Secretary of the Communist Party of Ukraine. The First Secretary exercised a large influence throughout the Soviet Union.

== First Secretaries ==
Name	Term of Office		Life years
Name	Start	End	Life years
?	1921	193.	
E.D. Aronsky	193.	1934	
Nikita Alekseyev	1934	1935	1892–1937
?	1935	1937	
Sergei Kudryavtsev	January 1937	September 1937	1903–1938
Afanasiy Yegorov (Note: Acting)	1938	1938	
Nikita Khrushchev	1938	1941	1894–1971
Nazi German occupation (September 19, 1941 – November 6, 1943)
Nikita Khrushchev	November 1943	March 22, 1947	1894–1971
Zynoviy Serdyuk	March 22, 1947	February 1949	1903–1982
Oleksiy Hryza	February 1949	1950	1907–1969
Mykhailo Synytsya	1950	1960	1913–1985
Vasyl Drozdenko	June 1960	August 1962	1924–1982
Oleksandr Botvyn	August 1962	January 1963	1918–1998
?	1963	December 1964	
Oleksandr Botvyn	December 1963	January 11, 1980	1918–1998
Yuriy Yelchenko	January 11, 1980	April 28, 1987	1929–
Kostyantyn Masyk	April 28, 1987	July 22, 1989	1936–
Anatoliy Korniyenko	July 22, 1989	August 1991	1938–

== See also ==
- Kyiv Regional Committee of the Communist Party of Ukraine

== Sources ==
- World Statesmen.org
