= Zetix =

Auxetic fabric

Zetix is a fabric invented by Auxetics Technologies, Ltd., a UK company. Zetix is an auxetic material strong enough to absorb and disperse shockwaves from explosions without breaking.

== Usage ==
Zetix is used in water-activated tape, also referred to as gummed paper tape, a popular form of carton sealing, under the trading name Xtegra™ Tegrabond™.

Zetix is also used in thread and ropes. Knots under tension may be more secure because auxetic material expands when stretched. It is known as Xtegra™ Auxetic Yarn with Kevlar®, outside of the United Kingdom.
