= Metamaterial =

Materials engineered to have properties that have not yet been found in nature

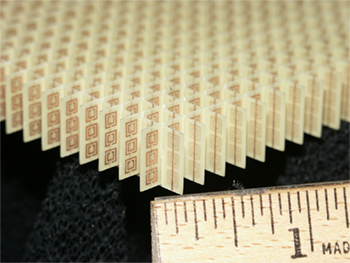
Negative-index metamaterial array configuration, which was constructed of copper split-ring resonators and wires mounted on interlocking sheets of fiberglass circuit board. The total array consists of 3×20×20 unit cells with overall dimensions of 10 mm × 100 mm × 100 mm (0.39 in × 3.94 in × 3.94 in).

A metamaterial (from the Greek word μετά meta, meaning 'beyond' or 'after', and the Latin word materia, meaning 'matter' or 'material') is an engineered material whose properties arise not from the chemical composition of its base substances, but from their deliberately designed internal structure. These properties are often rare or absent in naturally occurring materials. Metamaterials are typically fashioned from multiple materials, such as metals and plastics, and arranged in repeating patterns at scales that are smaller than the wavelengths of the phenomena they influence. Their shape, geometry, size, orientation, and arrangement give them their properties of manipulating electromagnetic, acoustic, or seismic waves: by blocking, absorbing, enhancing, or bending waves, to achieve benefits that go beyond what is possible with conventional materials. Those that exhibit a negative index of refraction for particular wavelengths have been the focus of a substantial amount of research.

Potential applications of metamaterials are diverse and include sports equipment, optical filters, medical devices, remote aerospace applications, sensor detection and infrastructure monitoring, smart solar power management, lasers, crowd control, radomes, high-frequency battlefield communication and lenses for high-gain antennas, improving ultrasonic sensors, and even shielding structures from earthquakes. Metamaterials offer the potential to create super-lenses. A form of 'invisibility' was demonstrated using gradient-index materials. Acoustic and seismic metamaterials are also research areas.

Metamaterial research is interdisciplinary and involves such fields as electrical engineering, electromagnetics, classical optics, solid state physics, microwave and antenna engineering, optoelectronics, material sciences, nanoscience and semiconductor engineering. Recent developments also suggest potential applications of metamaterials in optical computing, with metamaterial-based systems theoretically being able to perform certain tasks more efficiently than conventional computing.

== History ==
Explorations of artificial materials for manipulating electromagnetic waves began at the end of the 19th century. Some of the earliest structures that may be considered metamaterials were studied by Jagadish Chandra Bose, who in 1898 researched substances with chiral properties. Karl Ferdinand Lindman studied wave interaction with metallic helices as artificial chiral media in the early twentieth century.

In the late 1940s, Winston E. Kock from AT&T Bell Laboratories developed materials that had similar characteristics to metamaterials. In the 1950s and 1960s, artificial dielectrics were studied for lightweight microwave antennas. Microwave radar absorbers were researched in the 1980s and 1990s as applications for artificial chiral media.

Negative-index materials were first described theoretically by Victor Veselago in 1967. He proved that such materials could transmit light. He showed that the phase velocity could be made anti-parallel to the direction of Poynting vector. This is contrary to wave propagation in naturally occurring materials.

In 1995, John M. Guerra fabricated a sub-wavelength transparent grating (later called a photonic metamaterial) having 50 nm lines and spaces, and then coupled it with a standard oil immersion microscope objective (the combination later called a super-lens ) to resolve a grating in a silicon wafer also having 50 nm lines and spaces. This super-resolved image was achieved with illumination having a wavelength of 650 nm in air.

In 2000, John Pendry was the first to identify a practical way to make a left-handed metamaterial, a material in which the right-hand rule is not followed. Such a material allows an electromagnetic wave to convey energy (have a group velocity) against its phase velocity. Pendry hypothesized that metallic wires aligned along the direction of a wave could provide negative permittivity (dielectric function ε < 0). Natural materials (such as ferroelectrics) display negative permittivity; the challenge was achieving negative permeability (μ < 0). In 1999, Pendry demonstrated that a split ring (C shape) with its axis placed along the direction of wave propagation could do so. In the same paper, he showed that a periodic array of wires and rings could give rise to a negative refractive index. Pendry also proposed a related negative-permeability design, the Swiss roll.

In 2000, David R. Smith et al. reported the experimental demonstration of functioning electromagnetic metamaterials by horizontally stacking, periodically, split-ring resonators and thin wire structures. A method was provided in 2002 to realize negative-index metamaterials using artificial lumped-element loaded transmission lines in microstrip technology. In 2003, complex (both real and imaginary parts of) negative refractive index and imaging by flat lens using left handed metamaterials were demonstrated. Negative index of refraction in the optical range was first demonstrated by Vladimir Shalaev et al. By 2007, experiments that involved negative refractive index had been conducted by many groups. At microwave frequencies, the first, imperfect invisibility cloak was realized in 2006.

From the standpoint of governing equations, contemporary researchers can classify the realm of metamaterials into three primary branches: Electromagnetic/Optical wave metamaterials, other wave metamaterials, and diffusion metamaterials. These branches are characterized by their respective governing equations, which include Maxwell's equations (a wave equation describing transverse waves), other wave equations (for longitudinal and transverse waves), and diffusion equations (pertaining to diffusion processes). Crafted to govern a range of diffusion activities, diffusion metamaterials prioritize diffusion length as their central metric. This crucial parameter experiences temporal fluctuations while remaining immune to frequency variations. In contrast, wave metamaterials, designed to adjust various wave propagation paths, consider the wavelength of incoming waves as their essential metric. This wavelength remains constant over time, though it adjusts with frequency alterations. Fundamentally, the key metrics for diffusion and wave metamaterials present a stark divergence, underscoring a distinct complementary relationship between them. For comprehensive information, refer to Section I.B, "Evolution of metamaterial physics," in Ref.

== Types ==
=== Electromagnetic metamaterials ===
Electromagnetic metamaterials are metamaterials affecting electromagnetic waves that impinge on or interact with its structural features, which are smaller than the radiation wavelength. To behave as a homogeneous material accurately described by an effective refractive index, its features must be much smaller than the wavelength.

The unusual properties of metamaterials arise from the resonant response of each constituent element rather than their spatial arrangement into a lattice. It allows considering the local effective material parameters (permittivity and permeability). The resonance effect related to the mutual arrangement of elements is responsible for Bragg scattering, which underlies the physics of photonic crystals, another class of electromagnetic materials. Unlike the local resonances, Bragg scattering and corresponding Bragg stop-band have a low-frequency limit determined by the lattice spacing. The subwavelength approximation ensures that the Bragg stop-bands with the strong spatial dispersion effects are at higher frequencies and can be neglected. The criterion for shifting the local resonance below the lower Bragg stop-band make it possible to build a photonic phase transition diagram in a parameter space, for example, size and permittivity of the constituent element. Such diagram displays the domain of structure parameters allowing the metamaterial properties observation in the electromagnetic material.

For microwave radiation, the features are on the order of millimeters. Microwave frequency metamaterials are usually constructed as arrays of electrically conductive elements (such as loops of wire) that have suitable inductive and capacitive characteristics. Many microwave metamaterials use split-ring resonators.

Photonic metamaterials are structured on the nanometer scale and manipulate light at optical frequencies. Photonic crystals and frequency-selective surfaces such as diffraction gratings, dielectric mirrors and optical coatings exhibit similarities to subwavelength structured metamaterials. However, these are usually considered distinct from metamaterials, as their function arises from diffraction or interference and thus cannot be approximated as a homogeneous material. However, material structures such as photonic crystals are effective in the visible light spectrum. The middle of the visible spectrum has a wavelength of approximately 560 nm (for sunlight). Photonic crystal structures are generally half this size or smaller, that is < 280 nm.

Plasmonic metamaterials utilize surface plasmons, which are packets of electrical charge that collectively oscillate at the surfaces of metals at optical frequencies.

Frequency selective surfaces (FSS) can exhibit subwavelength characteristics and are known variously as artificial magnetic conductors (AMC) or High Impedance Surfaces (HIS). FSS display inductive and capacitive characteristics that are directly related to their subwavelength structure.

Electromagnetic metamaterials can be divided into different classes, as follows:

=== Mechanical metamaterials ===
Mechanical metamaterials are metamaterials derived from their unique internal structures rather than the materials from which they are made. Inspiration for mechanical metamaterials design often comes from biological materials (such as honeycombs and cells), from molecular and crystalline unit cell structures as well as the artistic fields of origami and kirigami. While early mechanical metamaterials had regular repeats of simple unit cell structures, increasingly complex units and architectures are now being explored. Mechanical metamaterials can be seen as a counterpart to optical metamaterials and electromagnetic metamaterials. Mechanical metamaterials are the broad umbrella term, defined by architected structures at nano, micro, meso, and macro scales that produce properties unattainable in conventional materials. Mechanical properties, including elasticity, viscoelasticity, thermoelasticity, and thermal conductivity, are key design targets in mechanical metamaterials.

Three main types of mechanical metamaterials can be distinguished. The first involves static or quasi-static responses, such as auxeticity, tunable stiffness, multistability, or programmable deformation. The second involves dynamic wave phenomena in solids, often referred to as elastic or elastodynamic metamaterials, where resonant or periodic architectures control both longitudinal and shear wave propagation through effective properties such as negative mass density or modulus. Acoustic metamaterials fall within this dynamic branch and are designed to control longitudinal pressure waves in fluids as well as in solids where shear effects are negligible, through tailored effective density and bulk modulus. The third branch encompasses thermal metamaterials, which manipulate heat conduction and diffusion. These are considered mechanical metamaterials because their unusual thermal responses arise from engineered architecture rather than composition, enabling anisotropic conduction, thermal cloaking, and directional heat management using structures such as aligned fibers or carbon nanotube arrays. Mainstream research on mechanical metamaterials has focused on static and quasi-static properties that can be designed to take values not found in nature, such as negative stiffness, negative Poisson's ratio, negative compressibility, and vanishing shear modulus.

=== Acoustic ===
Acoustic metamaterials, sometimes referred to as sonic or phononic crystals, are architected materials designed to manipulate sound waves or phonons in gases, liquids, and solids. By tailoring effective parameters such as bulk modulus (β), density (ρ), and in some cases chirality, they can be engineered to transmit, trap, or attenuate waves at selected frequencies, functioning as acoustic resonators when local resonances dominate. Within the broader field of mechanical metamaterials, acoustic metamaterials represent the dynamic branch where wave control is the primary goal.

Acoustic metamaterials control, direct and manipulate sound in the form of sonic, infrasonic or ultrasonic waves in gases, liquids and solids. As with electromagnetic waves, sonic waves can exhibit negative refraction.

Control of sound waves is mostly accomplished through the bulk modulus β, mass density ρ and chirality. The bulk modulus and density are analogs of permittivity and permeability in electromagnetic metamaterials. Related to this is the mechanics of sound wave propagation in a lattice structure. Also materials have mass and intrinsic degrees of stiffness. Together, these form a resonant system and the mechanical (sonic) resonance may be excited by appropriate sonic frequencies (for example audible pulses).

Willis materials exhibit additional nonlocal material parameters for elastic-wave manipulation—analogous to the bianisotropic moduli in electromagnetic media—that couple stress with particle velocity and linear momentum with strain, known as Willis couplings. They are named after J. R. Willis, who predicted them using a dynamic homogenization method. Much of the recent interest in Willis couplings has been driven by their local form (the Milton–Briane–Willis equations). By extending Willis's homogenization method, Pernas-Salomón and Shmuel were the first to show that piezoelectric composites exhibit an effective coupling between linear momentum and the electric field, which they termed electro-momentum coupling. Electro-momentum coupling provides a mechanism for wave manipulation similar to Willis coupling, with the added benefit of electrical tunability.

=== Other types ===
==== Structural ====
Structural metamaterials are a type of mechanical metamaterial that provide properties such as crushability and lightweight characteristics. Using projection micro-stereolithography, microlattices can be created using forms much like trusses and girders. Materials four orders of magnitude stiffer than conventional aerogel, but with the same density have been created. Such materials can withstand a load of at least 160,000 times their own weight by over-constraining the materials.

A ceramic nanotruss metamaterial can be flattened and revert to its original state.

While metamaterials derive their properties from engineered micro- or nano-scale architectures that manipulate wave behaviour, metastructures operate at the macro-scale, using geometric design and modular assembly to achieve multifunctional mechanical performance across larger systems. Fully bio-based composite and modular metastructure cells based on trussed geometry encompassing bamboo rods and plant-based polymer joints demonstrate scalable mechanical performance, supporting up to 700 kg in compression with a mass of 30 g.

==== Thermal ====
Typically, materials found in nature, when homogeneous, are thermally isotropic, meaning heat diffuses at roughly the same rate in all directions. Thermal metamaterials, as a subclass of mechanical metamaterials, achieve anisotropic and tailored thermal responses through architected internal structures. The term arose around 2008, when Fan, Gao, and Huang demonstrated shaped graded materials with apparent negative thermal conductivity, and introduced the concept of a thermal cloak through transformation thermotics. By carefully designing their geometry at nano, micro, meso, or macro scales, these materials exhibit effective thermal conductivities not accessible in natural materials. Their classification as mechanical metamaterials stems from the fact that their unusual thermal behavior arises from engineered structure rather than chemical composition. Examples include composites with highly aligned fibers, particle arrays, or carbon nanotubes, where directional organization enables controlled heat flow.

==== Nonlinear ====
Metamaterials may be fabricated that include some form of nonlinear media, whose properties change with the power of the incident wave. Nonlinear media are essential for nonlinear optics. Most optical materials have a relatively weak response, meaning that their properties change by only a small amount for large changes in the intensity of the electromagnetic field. The local electromagnetic fields of the inclusions in nonlinear metamaterials can be much larger than the average value of the field. Besides, remarkable nonlinear effects have been predicted and observed if the metamaterial effective dielectric permittivity is very small (epsilon-near-zero media). In addition, exotic properties such as a negative refractive index, create opportunities to tailor the phase matching conditions that must be satisfied in any nonlinear optical structure and can strongly modify the known nonlinear effects and enable new ones.

==== Liquid ====
Metafluids offer programmable properties such as viscosity, compressibility, and optical. One approach employed 50-500 micron diameter air-filled elastomer spheres suspended in silicon oil. The spheres compress under pressure, and regain their shape when the pressure is relieved. Their properties differ across those two states. Unpressurized, they scatter light, making them opaque. Under pressure, they collapse into half-moon shapes, focusing light, and becoming transparent. The pressure response could allow them to act as a sensor or as a dynamic hydraulic fluid. Like cornstarch, it can act as either a Newtonian or a non-Newtonian fluid. Under pressure, it becomes non-Newtonian – meaning its viscosity changes in response to shear force.

==== Hall metamaterials ====
In 2009, Marc Briane and Graeme Milton proved mathematically that one can in principle invert the sign of a 3 materials based composite in 3D made out of only positive or negative sign Hall coefficient materials. Later in 2015 Muamer Kadic et al. showed that a simple perforation of isotropic material can lead to its change of sign of the Hall coefficient. This theoretical claim was finally experimentally demonstrated by Christian Kern et al.

In 2015, it was also demonstrated by Christian Kern et al. that an anisotropic perforation of a single material can lead to a yet more unusual effect namely the parallel Hall effect. This means that the induced electric field inside a conducting media is no longer orthogonal to the current and the magnetic field but is actually parallel to the latest.

== Frequency bands ==
=== Terahertz ===
Terahertz metamaterials interact at terahertz frequencies, usually defined as 0.1 to 10 THz. Terahertz radiation lies at the far end of the infrared band, just after the end of the microwave band. This corresponds to millimeter and submillimeter wavelengths between the 3 mm (EHF band) and 0.03 mm (long-wavelength edge of far-infrared light).

=== Photonic ===
Photonic metamaterial interact with optical frequencies (mid-infrared). The sub-wavelength period distinguishes them from photonic band gap structures.

=== Tunable ===
Tunable metamaterials allow arbitrary adjustments to frequency changes in the refractive index. A tunable metamaterial expands beyond the bandwidth limitations in left-handed materials by constructing various types of metamaterials.

=== Plasmonic ===
Plasmonic metamaterials exploit surface plasmons, which are produced from the interaction of light with metal-dielectrics. Under specific conditions, the incident light couples with the surface plasmons to create self-sustaining, propagating electromagnetic waves or surface waves known as surface plasmon polaritons. Bulk plasma oscillations make possible the effect of negative mass (density).

== Applications ==
Metamaterials are under consideration for many applications. Metamaterial antennas are commercially available.

In 2007, one researcher stated that for metamaterial applications to be realized, energy loss must be reduced, materials must be extended into three-dimensional isotropic materials and production techniques must be industrialized.

All-dielectric subwavelength metasurface focusing lens operating in the near infrared has been demonstrated by the Shalaev group in collaboration with the Raytheon team. This lens is currently used in Raytheon defense system products.

=== Antennas ===
Metamaterial antennas are a class of antennas that use metamaterials to improve performance. Demonstrations showed that metamaterials could enhance an antenna's radiated power. Materials that can attain negative permeability allow for properties such as small antenna size, high directivity and tunable frequency.

=== Absorber ===
A metamaterial absorber manipulates the loss components of metamaterials' permittivity and magnetic permeability, to absorb large amounts of electromagnetic radiation. This is a useful feature for photodetection and solar photovoltaic applications. Loss components are also relevant in applications of negative refractive index (photonic metamaterials, antenna systems) or transformation optics (metamaterial cloaking, celestial mechanics), but often are not used in these applications.

=== Superlens ===
A superlens is a two or three-dimensional device that uses metamaterials, usually with negative refraction properties, to achieve resolution beyond the diffraction limit (ideally, infinite resolution). Such a behavior is enabled by the capability of double-negative materials to yield negative phase velocity. The diffraction limit is inherent in conventional optical devices or lenses.

=== Metamaterial cloaking ===
Metamaterials are a potential basis for a practical cloaking device. The proof of principle was demonstrated on October 19, 2006. No practical cloaks are publicly known to exist.

=== Radar cross-section (RCS-)reducing metamaterials ===
Metamaterials have applications in stealth technology, which reduces RCS in any of various ways (e.g., absorption, diffusion, redirection). Conventionally, the RCS has been reduced either by radar-absorbent material (RAM) or by purpose shaping of the targets such that the scattered energy can be redirected away from the source. While RAMs have narrow frequency band functionality, purpose shaping limits the aerodynamic performance of the target. More recently, metamaterials or metasurfaces have been synthesized that can redirect the scattered energy away from the source using either array theory or generalized Snell's law. This has led to aerodynamically favorable shapes for the targets with the reduced RCS.

=== Seismic protection ===
Seismic metamaterials counteract the adverse effects of seismic waves on man-made structures.

=== Sound filtering ===
Metamaterials textured with nanoscale wrinkles could control sound or light signals, such as changing a material's color or improving ultrasound resolution. Uses include nondestructive material testing, medical diagnostics and sound suppression. The materials can be made through a high-precision, multi-layer deposition process. The thickness of each layer can be controlled within a fraction of a wavelength. The material is then compressed, creating precise wrinkles whose spacing can cause scattering of selected frequencies.

=== Guided mode manipulations ===
Metamaterials can be integrated with optical waveguides to tailor guided electromagnetic waves (meta-waveguide). Subwavelength structures like metamaterials can be integrated with for instance silicon waveguides to develop and polarization beam splitters and optical couplers, adding new degrees of freedom of controlling light propagation at nanoscale for integrated photonic devices. Other applications such as integrated mode converters, polarization (de)multiplexers, structured light generation, and on-chip bio-sensors can be developed.

== Theoretical models ==
All materials are made of atoms, which are dipoles. These dipoles modify light velocity by a factor n (the refractive index). In a split ring resonator the ring and wire units act as atomic dipoles: the wire acts as a ferroelectric atom, while the ring acts as an inductor L, while the open section acts as a capacitor C. The ring as a whole acts as an LC circuit. When the electromagnetic field passes through the ring, an induced current is created. The generated field is perpendicular to the light's magnetic field. The magnetic resonance results in a negative permeability; the refraction index is negative as well. (The lens is not truly flat, since the structure's capacitance imposes a slope for the electric induction.)

Several (mathematical) material models predict frequency response in DNGs. One of these is the Lorentz model, which describes electron motion in terms of a driven-damped, harmonic oscillator. The Debye relaxation model applies when the acceleration component of the Lorentz mathematical model is small compared to the other components of the equation. The Drude model applies when the restoring force component is negligible and the coupling coefficient is generally the plasma frequency. Other component distinctions call for the use of one of these models, depending on its polarity or purpose.

Three-dimensional composites of metal/non-metallic inclusions periodically/randomly embedded in a low permittivity matrix are usually modeled by analytical methods, including mixing formulas and scattering-matrix based methods. The particle is modeled by either an electric dipole parallel to the electric field or a pair of crossed electric and magnetic dipoles parallel to the electric and magnetic fields, respectively, of the applied wave. These dipoles are the leading terms in the multipole series. They are the only existing ones for a homogeneous sphere, whose polarizability can be easily obtained from the Mie scattering coefficients. In general, this procedure is known as the "point-dipole approximation", which is a good approximation for metamaterials consisting of composites of electrically small spheres. Merits of these methods include low calculation cost and mathematical simplicity.

Three conceptions- negative-index medium, non-reflecting crystal and superlens are foundations of the metamaterial theory. Other first principles techniques for analyzing triply-periodic electromagnetic media may be found in Computing photonic band structure

== Institutional networks ==
=== MURI ===
The Multidisciplinary University Research Initiative (MURI) encompasses dozens of Universities and a few government organizations. Participating universities include UC Berkeley, UC Los Angeles, UC San Diego, Massachusetts Institute of Technology, and Imperial College in London. The sponsors are Office of Naval Research and the Defense Advanced Research Project Agency.

MURI supports research that intersects more than one traditional science and engineering discipline to accelerate both research and translation to applications. As of 2009, 69 academic institutions were expected to participate in 41 research efforts.

=== Metamorphose ===
The Virtual Institute for Artificial Electromagnetic Materials and Metamaterials "Metamorphose VI AISBL" is an international association to promote artificial electromagnetic materials and metamaterials. It organizes scientific conferences, supports specialized journals, creates and manages research programs, provides training programs (including PhD and training programs for industrial partners); and technology transfer to European Industry.

== See also ==
- Metamaterials Handbook
- Metamaterials: Physics and Engineering Explorations
- Metasurface
- Artificial dielectrics—macroscopic analogues of naturally occurring dielectrics that came into use with the radar microwave technologies developed between the 1940s and 1970s.
- METATOY (Metamaterial for rays)—composed of super-wavelength structures, such as small arrays of prisms and lenses and can operate over a broad band of frequencies
- Magnonics
