= Dimitri Gladki =

Moldavian SSR politician (1911–1959)

Dimitri Gladkyi
- Дмитрий Гладкий

First Secretary of the Moldavian Communist Party
- In office 25 October 1952 – 7 February 1954
- Premier: Gherasim Rudi
- Preceded by: Leonid Brezhnev
- Succeeded by: Zinovie Serdiuk

Personal details
- Born: 19 October 1911 Martonosha, Russian Empire (now Ukraine)
- Died: 27 October 1959 (aged 48) Chișinău, Moldavian SSR, Soviet Union
- Party: Communist Party of Moldova

Dmitry Gladkyi (19 October 1911 – 27 October 1959) was a Moldavian SSR politician.

== Biography ==
Dmitry Spiridonovich Gladkyi was born in 1911 and died in 1959. He died when he was only 48.

Dmitry Gladkyi was a First Secretary of the Moldavian Communist Party (October 25, 1952 - February 7, 1954).

== Bibliography ==
- Enciclopedia sovietică moldovenească (Chişinău, 1970–1977)

Party political offices
Preceded by Leonid Brezhnev	First Secretary of the Moldavian Communist Party; 25 October 1952 – 7 February 1954	Succeeded by Zinovie Serdiuk
