= METATOY =

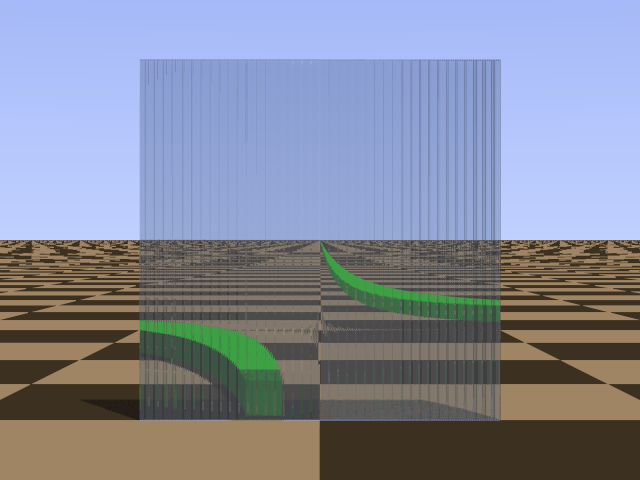
View through an array of elongated, upright, Dove prisms, forming a METATOY that flips the horizontal direction of transmitted light rays. A green box, stretched in the direction perpendicular to the METATOY, appears bent into a hyperbola when seen through the METATOY. A close-up view of the METATOY can be seen in the following picture.

A METATOY is a sheet, formed by a two-dimensional array of small, telescopic optical components, that switches the path of transmitted light rays. METATOY is an acronym for "metamaterial for rays", representing a number of analogies with metamaterials; METATOYs even satisfy a few definitions of metamaterials, but are certainly not metamaterials in the usual sense. When seen from a distance, the view through each individual telescopic optical component acts as one pixel of the view through the METATOY as a whole. In the simplest case, the individual optical components are all identical; the METATOY then behaves like a homogeneous, but pixellated, window that can have very unusual optical properties (see the picture of the view through a METATOY).

METATOYs are usually treated within the framework of geometrical optics; the light-ray-direction change performed by a METATOY is described by a mapping of the direction of any incoming light ray onto the corresponding direction of the outgoing ray. The light-ray-direction mappings can be very general. METATOYs can even create pixellated light-ray fields that could not exist in non-pixellated form due to a condition imposed by wave optics.

Much of the work on METATOYs is currently theoretical, backed up by computer simulations. A small number of experiments have been performed to date; more experimental work is ongoing.

== Examples ==
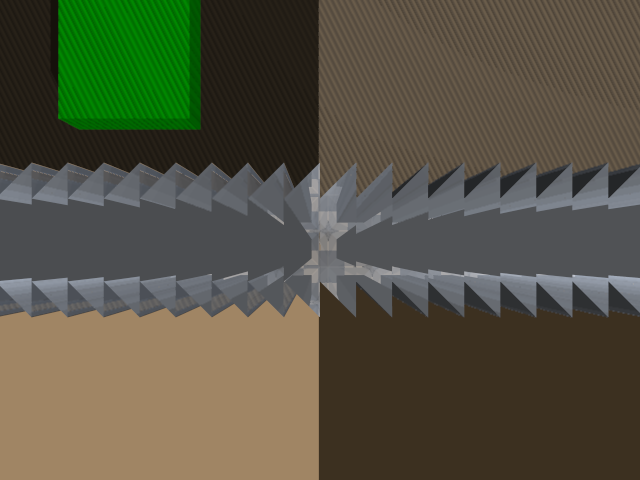
Close-up view of a METATOY formed by an array of upright Dove prisms, seen from above. The view through the METATOY is shown in the previous image.

Telescopic optical components that have been used as the unit cell of two-dimensional arrays, and which therefore form homogeneous METATOYs, include a pair of identical lenses (focal length $f$) that share the same optical axis (perpendicular to the METATOY) and that are separated by $2 f$, that is they share one focal plane (a special case of a refracting telescope with angular magnification -1); a pair of non-identical lenses (focal lengths $f_1$ and $f_2$) that share the same optical axis (again perpendicular to the METATOY) and that are separated by $f_1 + f_2$, that is they again share one focal plane (a generalization of the former case, a refracting telescope with any angular magnification); a pair of non-identical lenses (focal lengths $f_1$ and $f_2$) that share one focal plane, that is, they share the direction of the optical axis, which is not necessarily perpendicular to the METATOY, and they are separated by $f_1 + f_2$ (a generalization of the former case); a prism; and a Dove prism

Examples of inhomogeneous METATOYs include the moiré magnifier, which is based on deliberately "mis-aligned" pairs of confocal microlens arrays; Fresnel lenses, which can be seen as non-homogeneous METATOYs made from prisms; and frosted glass, which can be seen as an extreme case of an inhomogeneous, random METATOY made from prisms.

Examples of METATOYs as defined above have existed long before analogies with metamaterials were noted and it was recognized that METATOYs can perform wave-optically forbidden ray-direction mappings (in pixellated form).

== Wave-optical constraints on light-ray fields and METATOYs ==
Wave optics describes light at a more fundamental level than geometrical optics. In the ray-optics limit (in which the optical wavelength tends towards zero) of scalar optics (in which light is described as a scalar wave, an approximation that works well for paraxial light with uniform polarization), the light-ray field r$(x,y,z)$ corresponding to a light wave $u(x,y,z)$ is its phase gradient,

$\mathbf{r}(x,y,z)=\nabla \phi(x,y,z),$

where $\phi(x,y,z)$ is the phase of the wave $u(x,y,z)=A(x,y,z) \exp(i \phi(x,y,z))$. But according to vector calculus, the curl of any gradient is zero, that is

$\nabla \times \nabla \phi(x,y,z)=0,$

and therefore

$\nabla \times \mathbf{r}(x,y,z)=0.$

This last equation is a condition, derived from wave optics, on light-ray fields. (Each of the three equations that makes up this vector equation expresses the symmetry of the second spatial derivatives, which is how the condition was initially formulated.)

Using the example of ray-rotation sheets, it was shown that METATOYs can create light-ray fields that do not satisfy the above condition on light-ray fields.

== Relationship with metamaterials ==
METATOYs are not metamaterials in the standard sense. The acronym "metamaterial for rays" was chosen because of a number of similarities between METATOYs and metamaterials, which are discussed below, along with the differences. In addition, metamaterials provided the inspiration for early METATOYs research, as summarized in the following quote:

Motivated by the desire to build optical elements that have some of the visual properties of metamaterials on an everyday size scale and across the entire visible wavelength spectrum, we recently started to investigate sheets formed by miniaturized optical elements that change the direction of transmitted light rays.

=== Similarities with metamaterials ===
In a number of ways, METATOYs are analogous to metamaterials: structure: metamaterials are arrays of small (sub-wavelength size) wave-optical components (electro-magnetic circuits resonant with the optical frequency), whereas METATOYs are arrays of small (so that they work well as pixels), telescopic, "ray-optical components"; functionality: both metamaterials and METATOYs can behave like homogeneous materials, in the case of metamaterials a volume of material, in the case of METATOYs a sheet material, in both cases with very unusual optical properties such as negative refraction.

=== Differences with metamaterials ===
Arguably amongst the most startling properties of metamaterials are some that are fundamentally wave-optical, and therefore not reproduced in METATOYs. These include amplification of evanescent waves, which can, in principle, lead to perfect lenses ("superlenses") and magnifying superlenses ("hyperlenses"); reversal of the phase velocity; reversal of the Doppler shift.

However, because they are not bound by wave-optical constraints on light-ray fields, it can be argued that METATOYs can perform light-ray-direction changes that metamaterials could not, unless a METATOY was effectively built out of metamaterials.

== See also ==
- Fresnel lens
- Zone plate
