= Zinovie Serdiuk =

Ukrainian–Moldavian politician (1903–1982)

- Зиновий Сердюк
- Serdiuk in the 1970s

First Secretary of the Moldavian Communist Party
- In office 8 February 1954 – 29 May 1961
- Premier: Gherasim Rudi; Alexandru Diordiță
- Preceded by: Dimitri Gladki
- Succeeded by: Ivan Bodiul

Personal details
- Born: 15 November 1903 Harbuzynka, Russian Empire (now Ukraine)
- Died: 8 August 1982 (aged 78) Moscow, Russian SFSR, Soviet Union
- Party: Communist Party of the Soviet Union (1925–1982); Communist Party of Ukraine (1938–1954); Communist Party of Moldova (1954–1961)

Zinovie Timofeevici Serdiuk (15 November 1903 – 8 August 1982) was a Soviet politician who held senior politics in both the Ukrainian SSR and the Moldavian SSR. He served as First Secretary of the Moldavian Communist Party from 1954 to 1961.

== Biography ==
Zinovie Serdiuk (Russian: Зиновий Тимофеевич Сердюк) was born on 15 November 1903, in Harbuzynka, Kherson Governorate, Russian Empire. In 1923, he joined the Komsomol and became secretary of the Komsomol organization of the water-lifting plant of the Odesa Communal Department. He then became Chairman of the Yaniv District Trade Union Secretariat and later an inspector of the Odesa Labour Department. He then sought higher education, and was a student at the Higher School of the Trade Union Movement. Following his graduation inn 1931, he became Head of the Sector of Mass Production Labor of the Central Committee of the Trade Union of State Farms while simultaneously working as deputy chair then chair of the Oktyabrsky Trade Union Council in Moscow, until 1934. For a year afterward he was deputy political commander of the icebreaker Rusanov.

In 1935–1936 he was a deputy chief of political administration of the Chief Directorate of the Northern Sea Route.

Zinovie Serdiuk was the First Secretary of the Moldavian Communist Party (February 8, 1954 – May 29, 1961). During his rule the main accent was pointed on the atheism, while in the economic sector the finishing of collectivization by formation of kolkhozes and sovkhozes everywhere in the Moldavian SSR. A number of industrial units were built.

He died on August 8, 1982, in Moscow.

Party political offices
Preceded by Nikita Khrushchev	First Secretary of the Kyiv Oblast Committee of the Communist Party of Ukraine; 22 March 1947 – February 1949	Succeeded by Aleksei Gryza
Preceded by Vasiliy Chuchukalo	First Secretary of the Lviv Oblast Committee of the Communist Party of Ukraine; 4 April 1952 – 9 February 1954	Succeeded by Mikhail Lazurenko
Preceded by Dimitri Gladki	First Secretary of the Moldavian Communist Party; 8 February 1954 – 29 May 1961	Succeeded by Ivan Bodiul
