= Anne-Christine Hladky =

French metamaterials scientist

Anne-Christine Hladky-Hennion (born 1965) is a French researcher in acoustic metamaterials. She is a director of research for the French National Centre for Scientific Research (CNRS), and scientific deputy director of the CNRS Institute for Engineering and Systems Sciences (INSIS).

== Education and career ==
Hladky is originally from Lille, where she was born in 1965. After earning a diploma in 1987 from the Institut supérieur de l'électronique et du numérique in Lille, she continued her education at the Lille University of Science and Technology, where she earned a doctorate in 1990, in materials science. Her doctoral dissertation, Application de la méthode des éléments finis à la modélisation de structures périodiques utilisées en acoustique, was supervised by Jean-Noël Decarpigny.

She joined CNRS in 1992, and became a director of research in 2015.

== Recognition ==
Hladky was the 1990 winner of the Young Researcher Prize of the French Acoustical Society. In 2018 she received the CNRS Silver Medal.
