= Graeme Milton =

American mathematician (born 1956)

- Born: 1956 (age 69–70); Sydney, Australia
- Education: University of Sydney; Cornell University
- Awards: Alfred P. Sloan Fellowship (1988); Packard Fellowship(1988); SIAM Fellow (2009); 2012 Rolf Landauer International ETOPIM Association Medal
- Scientific career
- Fields: applied mathematics metamaterials nonlinear dynamics
- Workplaces: Caltech; Courant Institute of Mathematical Sciences; MSRI; KAIST; University of Utah
- Thesis: Some exotic models in statistical physics (1985)
- Doctoral advisor: Michael Fisher

Graeme Milton is an American mathematician, currently distinguished professor at University of Utah and also previously the Eisenbud Professor at Mathematical Sciences Research Institute in 2010 and also a full professor at Courant Institute of Mathematical Sciences.

== Biography ==
Graeme W. Milton received B.Sc. and M.Sc degrees in Physics from the University of Sydney in 1980 and 1982 respectively. He received a Ph.D degree in Physics from Cornell University in 1985, after which he joined the Caltech Physics Department as a Weingart Fellow from 1984 to 1986. He then joined the Courant Institute of Mathematical Sciences where he stayed until 1994 when he joined the faculty at the University of Utah as a full professor. He has received numerous honors and awards, including an Alfred P. Sloan Fellowship and a Packard Fellowship, both in 1988. He was an Invited Speaker for the 1998 International Congress of Mathematicians. He was awarded the Ralph E. Kleinman Prize in 2003 by the Society for Industrial and Applied Mathematics for “his many deep contributions to the modeling and analysis of composite materials.”
