= Jadwiga Hładki =

Polish artist

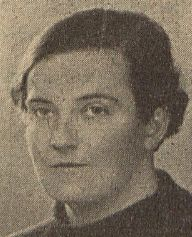
- Born: Jadwiga Salomea Hładki-Wajwódowa; 14 January 1904; Warsaw, Congress Poland
- Died: August 1944 (aged 40); Warsaw, German-occupied Poland

Jadwiga Salomea Hładki-Wajwódowa (14 January 1904 – August 1944) was a Polish artist. She competed in the art competitions at the 1932 Summer Olympics. She was killed during the Warsaw Uprising in 1944.
