= List of deprecated terms for diseases =

The following is a list of deprecated terms for diseases.

Obsolete term	Preferred term	Reference	Notes
2019 novel coronavirus (2019-nCoV)	Coronavirus disease 2019 (COVID-19)		Provisional name for COVID-19.
Apoplexy	Stroke		Also a general term for internal bleeding in a specific organ.
Ague	Malaria		
Bends	Decompression sickness		Referred to the associated musculoskeletal issues of decompression illness.
Bilious remitting fever	Dengue fever		Used in reference to a 1780 outbreak in Philadelphia.
Break-bone fever	Dengue fever		Used in reference to a 1780 outbreak in Philadelphia.
Break-heart fever	Dengue fever		
Chokes	Decompression sickness		Referred to the associated breathing issues of decompression illness.
Consumption	Tuberculosis		So-called due to the wasting that occurs in the late stages of infection.
Dandy fever	Dengue fever		A reference to the mincing walk adopted by those affected.
Dropsy	Edema		
Dum-dum fever	Leishmaniasis		The term is derived from the city of Dum Dum, the site of an outbreak.
English disease	Rickets		So named due to its prevalence in English slums.
Four Corners disease	Hantavirus pulmonary syndrome		Named for the area where it was initially identified. "Muerto Canyon disease" is likewise deprecated.
French disease	Syphilis		Used as an ethnic slur against the French.
Front-street fever	Dengue fever		Used in reference to a 1780 outbreak in Philadelphia.
Gargoylism	Hurler Syndrome (MPS Type 1)		In 1936, Ellis et al. coined the term "gargoylism" to name the syndrome.
Gay-related immune deficiency	Acquired immunodeficiency syndrome		Used in 1982 when it is suggested to be transmitted sexually among gay men.
Gleet	Gonorrhea		Usually refers to gonorrhea that is in semi-remission.
Great pox	Syphilis		Used as a term of comparison to smallpox.
Grippe	Influenza		From the French.
King's evil	Tuberculous cervical lymphadenitis		From the belief that the disease could be cured by a royal touch.
Lockjaw	Trismus		The term is sometimes used as a synonym for tetanus, which usually first manifests as trismus.
Monkeypox	Mpox		
Muerto Canyon disease	Hantavirus pulmonary syndrome		Named for the area where it was initially identified. "Four Corners disease" is likewise deprecated.
Norwalk virus	Norovirus		Named after the town of Norwalk, Ohio, where the disease was first distinctly identified.
Phthisis	Tuberculosis		From the Greek word for consumption.
Quinsy	Peritonsillar abscess		From the French term esquinancie.
Saint Vitus Dance	Sydenham's chorea		Named for Saint Vitus the Martyr
Spanish fever	Influenza		Used in reference to the 1918 flu pandemic.
Squinsy	Peritonsillar abscess		From the French term esquinancie.
Staggers	Decompression sickness		Referred to the associated neurological issues of decompression illness.
Undulant fever	Brucellosis		The name is a reference to the rising and falling of the patient's temperature.
White Plague	Tuberculosis		The name refers to the pallor of patients with "consumption" (severe tuberculosis).
Woolsorter's disease	Anthrax		Refers to people who tended to contract the disease (from the sheep)
