= Sergei Kudryavtsev (politician) =

Soviet politician

Sergei Aleksandrovich Kudryavtsev (1903 – April 25, 1938) was a Ukrainian Soviet politician and statesman. He was born in Kharkiv. During the Great Purge, he was arrested on October 13, 1937, and later executed by firing squad. After the death of Joseph Stalin, he was rehabilitated in 1956.

Kudryavtsev was born in Niva village of Tver Governorate.

== Bibliography ==
- Przewodnik po historii Partii Komunistycznej i ZSRR (ros.)
- http://www.alexanderyakovlev.org/almanah/almanah-dict-bio/1006037/9 (ros.)
- http://www.sakharov-center.ru/asfcd/martirolog/?t=page&id=8273 (ros.)
- http://www.knowbysight.info/KKK/04677.asp

Preceded by Pavel Postyshev	First Secretary of the Kiev Regional Committee; January–September 1937	Succeeded by Dmitriy Yevtushenko
