= Hankinson's equation =

Hankinson's equation (also called Hankinson's formula or Hankinson's criterion) is a mathematical relationship for predicting the off-axis uniaxial compressive strength of wood. The formula can also be used to compute the fiber stress or the stress wave velocity at the elastic limit as a function of grain angle in wood. For a wood that has uniaxial compressive strengths of $\sigma_0$ parallel to the grain and $\sigma_{90}$ perpendicular to the grain, Hankinson's equation predicts that the uniaxial compressive strength of the wood in a direction at an angle $\alpha$ to the grain is given by

$$\sigma_\alpha = \cfrac{\sigma_0~\sigma_{90}}{\sigma_0~\sin^2\alpha + \sigma_{90}~\cos^2\alpha}$$

Even though the original relation was based on studies of spruce, Hankinson's equation has been found to be remarkably accurate for many other types of wood. A generalized form of the Hankinson formula has also been used for predicting the uniaxial tensile strength of wood at an angle to the grain. This formula has the form

$$\sigma_\alpha = \cfrac{\sigma_0~\sigma_{90}}{\sigma_0~\sin^n\alpha + \sigma_{90}~\cos^n\alpha}$$

where the exponent $n$ can take values between 1.5 and 2.

The stress wave velocity at angle $\alpha$ to the grain at the elastic limit can similarly be obtained from the Hankinson formula

$$V(\alpha) = \frac{V_0 V_{90}}{V_0 \sin^2\alpha + V_{90} \cos^2\alpha}$$

where $V_0$ is the velocity parallel to the grain, $V_{90}$ is the velocity perpendicular to the grain and $\alpha$ is the grain angle.

== See also ==
- Material failure theory
- Linear elasticity
- Hooke's law
- Orthotropic material
- Transverse isotropy
