= Zener ratio =

The Zener ratio is a dimensionless number that is used to quantify the anisotropy for cubic crystals. It is sometimes referred as anisotropy ratio and is named after Clarence Zener. Conceptually, it quantifies how far a material is from being isotropic (where the value of 1 means an isotropic material).

Its mathematical definition is

$a_r = \frac{2 C_{44}}{C_{11} - C_{12}} ,$

where $C_{ij}$ refers to elastic constants in Voigt notation.

== Cubic materials ==
Cubic materials are special orthotropic materials that are invariant with respect to 90° rotations with respect to the principal axes, i.e., the material is the same along its principal axes. Due to these additional symmetries the stiffness tensor can be written with just three different material properties like

$$\underline{\underline{\mathsf{C}}} =
\begin{bmatrix}
C_{11} & C_{12} & C_{12} & 0 & 0 & 0 \\
C_{12} & C_{11} & C_{12} & 0 & 0 & 0  \\
C_{12} & C_{12} & C_{11} & 0 & 0 & 0 \\
0 & 0 & 0  & C_{44} & 0 & 0 \\
0 & 0 & 0  & 0 & C_{44} & 0\\
0 & 0 & 0  & 0 & 0 & C_{44} \end{bmatrix} \quad .$$

The inverse of this matrix is commonly written as

$$\underline{\underline{\mathsf{S}}} =
\begin{bmatrix}
\tfrac{1}{E} & - \tfrac{\nu}{E} & - \tfrac{\nu}{E} & 0 & 0 & 0 \\
-\tfrac{\nu}{E} & \tfrac{1}{E} & - \tfrac{\nu}{E} & 0 & 0 & 0 \\
-\tfrac{\nu}{E} & - \tfrac{\nu}{E} & \tfrac{1}{E} & 0 & 0 & 0 \\
0 & 0 & 0 & \tfrac{1}{G} & 0 & 0 \\
0 & 0 & 0 & 0 & \tfrac{1}{G} & 0 \\
0 & 0 & 0 & 0 & 0 & \tfrac{1}{G} \\
\end{bmatrix} \quad .$$

where ${E}\,$ is the Young's modulus, $G\,$ is the shear modulus, and $\nu\,$ is the Poisson's ratio. Therefore, we can think of the ratio as the relation between the shear modulus for the cubic material and its (isotropic) equivalent:

$a_r = \frac{G}{E/[2(1 + \nu)]} = \frac{2(1+\nu)G}{E} \equiv \frac{2 C_{44}}{C_{11} - C_{12}} .$

== Universal Elastic Anisotropy Index ==
The Zener ratio is only applicable to cubic crystals. To overcome this limitation, a 'Universal Elastic Anisotropy Index (AU)' was formulated from variational principles of elasticity and tensor algebra. The AU is now used to quantify the anisotropy of elastic crystals of all classes.

== Tensorial Anisotropy Index ==
The Tensorial Anisotropy Index A^{T} extends the Zener ratio for fully anisotropic materials and overcomes the limitation of the AU that is designed for materials exhibiting internal symmetries of elastic crystals, which is not always observed in multi-component composites. It takes into consideration all the 21 coefficients of the fully anisotropic stiffness tensor and covers the directional differences among the stiffness tensor groups.

It is composed of two major parts $A^I$and $A^A$, the former referring to components existing in cubic tensor and the latter in anisotropic tensor so that $A^T =A^I+A^A .$ This first component includes the modified Zener ratio and additionally accounts for directional differences in the material, which exist in orthotropic material, for instance. The second component of this index $A^A$ covers the influence of stiffness coefficients that are nonzero only for non-cubic materials and remains zero otherwise.

$A^I=A^{I,z}+A^{I,cov}= \frac{2 (C_{44}+C_{55}+C_{66})}{(C_{11} +C_{22} +C_{33} )- (C_{12}+C_{13} +C_{23} )}+\sum_{i=1}^3{\alpha(C_{Gi})},$

where $\alpha(C_{Gi})$ is the coefficient of variation for each stiffness group accounting for directional differences of material stiffness, i.e. $C_{G1}=[C_{11}, C_{22}, C_{33}], C_{G2}=[C_{44}, C_{55}, C_{66}], C_{G3}=[C_{12}, C_{23}, C_{13}].$In cubic materials each stiffness component in groups 1-3 has equal value and thus this expression reduces directly to Zener ratio for cubic materials.

The second component of this index $A^A$ is non-zero for complex materials or composites with only few or no symmetries in their internal structure. In such cases the remaining stiffness coefficients joined in three groups are not null $C_{G4}=[C_{34}, C_{45}, C_{56}], C_{G5}=[C_{14}, C_{25}, C_{36}], C_{G6}=[C_{24}, C_{35}, C_{46}, C_{15}, C_{26}, C_{16}].$

== See also ==
- Anisotropy
- Orthotropic material
- Linear elasticity
