= Orthotropic material =

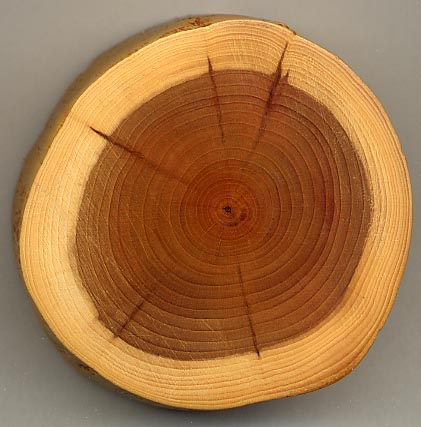
Wood is an example of an orthotropic material. Material properties in three perpendicular directions (axial, radial, and circumferential) are different.

In material science and solid mechanics, orthotropic materials have material properties at a particular point which differ along three orthogonal axes, where each axis has twofold rotational symmetry. These directional differences in strength can be quantified with Hankinson's equation.

They are a subset of anisotropic materials, because their properties change when measured from different directions.

A familiar example of an orthotropic material is wood. In wood, one can define three mutually perpendicular directions at each point in which the properties are different. It is most stiff (and strong) along the grain (axial direction), because most cellulose fibrils are aligned that way. It is usually least stiff in the radial direction (between the growth rings), and is intermediate in the circumferential direction. This anisotropy was provided by evolution, as it best enables the tree to remain upright.

Because the preferred coordinate system is cylindrical-polar, this type of orthotropy is also called polar orthotropy.

Another example of an orthotropic material is sheet metal formed by squeezing thick sections of metal between heavy rollers. This flattens and stretches its grain structure. As a result, the material becomes anisotropic — its properties differ between the direction it was rolled in and each of the two transverse directions. This method is used to advantage in structural steel beams, and in aluminium aircraft skins.

If orthotropic properties vary between points inside an object, it possesses both orthotropy and inhomogeneity. This suggests that orthotropy is the property of a point within an object rather than for the object as a whole (unless the object is homogeneous). The associated planes of symmetry are also defined for a small region around a point and do not necessarily have to be identical to the planes of symmetry of the whole object.

Orthotropic materials are a subset of anisotropic materials; their properties depend on the direction in which they are measured. Orthotropic materials have three planes/axes of symmetry. An isotropic material, in contrast, has the same properties in every direction. It can be proved that a material having two planes of symmetry must have a third one. Isotropic materials have an infinite number of planes of symmetry.

Transversely isotropic materials are special orthotropic materials that have one axis of symmetry (any other pair of axes that are perpendicular to the main one and orthogonal among themselves are also axes of symmetry). One common example of transversely isotropic material with one axis of symmetry is a polymer reinforced by parallel glass or graphite fibers. The strength and stiffness of such a composite material will usually be greater in a direction parallel to the fibers than in the transverse direction, and the thickness direction usually has properties similar to the transverse direction. Another example would be a biological membrane, in which the properties in the plane of the membrane will be different from those in the perpendicular direction. Orthotropic material properties have been shown to provide a more accurate representation of bone's elastic symmetry and can also give information about the three-dimensional directionality of bone's tissue-level material properties.

It is important to keep in mind that a material which is anisotropic on one length scale may be isotropic on another (usually larger) length scale. For instance, most metals are polycrystalline with very small grains. Each of the individual grains may be anisotropic, but if the material as a whole comprises many randomly oriented grains, then its measured mechanical properties will be an average of the properties over all possible orientations of the individual grains.

== Orthotropy in physics ==
=== Anisotropic material relations ===
Material behavior is represented in physical theories by constitutive relations. A large class of physical behaviors can be represented by linear material models that take the form of a second-order tensor. The material tensor provides a relation between two vectors and can be written as

$$\mathbf{f} = \boldsymbol{K}\cdot\mathbf{d}$$

where $\mathbf{d},\mathbf{f}$ are two vectors representing physical quantities and $\boldsymbol{K}$ is the second-order material tensor. If we express the above equation in terms of components with respect to an orthonormal coordinate system, we can write

$$f_i = K_{ij}~d_j ~.$$

Summation over repeated indices has been assumed in the above relation. In matrix form we have

$$\underline{\mathbf{f}} = \underline{\underline{\boldsymbol{K}}}~\underline{\mathbf{d}}
\implies \begin{bmatrix} f_1\\f_2\\f_3 \end{bmatrix} = \begin{bmatrix} K_{11} & K_{12} & K_{13} \\ K_{21} & K_{22} & K_{23} \\
K_{31} & K_{32} & K_{33} \end{bmatrix} \begin{bmatrix} d_1\\d_2\\d_3 \end{bmatrix}$$

Examples of physical problems that fit the above template are listed in the table below.

Problem	$\mathbf{f}$	$\mathbf{d}$	$\boldsymbol{K}$
Electrical conduction	Electrical current $\mathbf{J}$	Electric field $\mathbf{E}$	Electrical conductivity $\boldsymbol{\sigma}$
Dielectrics	Electrical displacement $\mathbf{D}$	Electric field $\mathbf{E}$	Electric permittivity $\boldsymbol{\varepsilon}$
Magnetism	Magnetic induction $\mathbf{B}$	Magnetic field $\mathbf{H}$	Magnetic permeability $\boldsymbol{\mu}$
Thermal conduction	Heat flux $\mathbf{q}$	Temperature gradient $-\boldsymbol{\nabla}T$	Thermal conductivity $\boldsymbol{\kappa}$
Diffusion	Particle flux $\mathbf{J}$	Concentration gradient $-\boldsymbol{\nabla}c$	Diffusivity $\boldsymbol{D}$
Flow in porous media	Weighted fluid velocity $\eta_\mu\mathbf{v}$	Pressure gradient $\boldsymbol{\nabla}P$	Fluid permeability $\boldsymbol{\kappa}$

=== Condition for material symmetry ===
The material matrix $\underline{\underline{\boldsymbol{K}}}$ has a symmetry with respect to a given orthogonal transformation ($\boldsymbol{A}$) if it does not change when subjected to that transformation. For invariance of the material properties under such a transformation we require

$$\boldsymbol{A}\cdot\mathbf{f} = \boldsymbol{K}\cdot(\boldsymbol{A}\cdot\boldsymbol{d}) \implies \mathbf{f} = (\boldsymbol{A}^{-1}\cdot\boldsymbol{K}\cdot\boldsymbol{A})\cdot\boldsymbol{d}$$

Hence the condition for material symmetry is (using the definition of an orthogonal transformation)

$$\boldsymbol{K} = \boldsymbol{A}^{-1}\cdot\boldsymbol{K}\cdot\boldsymbol{A} = \boldsymbol{A}^{T}\cdot\boldsymbol{K}\cdot\boldsymbol{A}$$

Orthogonal transformations can be represented in Cartesian coordinates by a $3\times 3$ matrix $\underline{\underline{\boldsymbol{A}}}$ given by

$$\underline{\underline{\boldsymbol{A}}} = \begin{bmatrix} A_{11} & A_{12} & A_{13} \\ A_{21} & A_{22} & A_{23} \\
A_{31} & A_{32} & A_{33} \end{bmatrix}~.$$

Therefore, the symmetry condition can be written in matrix form as

$$\underline{\underline{\boldsymbol{K}}} = \underline{\underline{\boldsymbol{A}^T}}~\underline{\underline{\boldsymbol{K}}}~\underline{\underline{\boldsymbol{A}}}$$

=== Orthotropic material properties ===
An orthotropic material has three orthogonal symmetry planes. If we choose an orthonormal coordinate system such that the axes coincide with the normals to the three symmetry planes, the transformation matrices are

$$\underline{\underline{\boldsymbol{A}_1}} = \begin{bmatrix}-1 & 0 & 0 \\ 0 & 1 & 0 \\ 0 & 0 & 1 \end{bmatrix} ~;~~
\underline{\underline{\boldsymbol{A}_2}} = \begin{bmatrix}1 & 0 & 0 \\ 0 & -1 & 0 \\ 0 & 0 & 1 \end{bmatrix} ~;~~
\underline{\underline{\boldsymbol{A}_3}} = \begin{bmatrix}1 & 0 & 0 \\ 0 & 1 & 0 \\ 0 & 0 & -1 \end{bmatrix}$$

It can be shown that if the matrix $\underline{\underline{\boldsymbol{K}}}$ for a material is invariant under reflection about two orthogonal planes then it is also invariant under reflection about the third orthogonal plane.

Consider the reflection $\underline{\underline{\boldsymbol{A}_3}}$ about the $1-2\,$ plane. Then we have

$$\underline{\underline{\boldsymbol{K}}} = \underline{\underline{\boldsymbol{A}^T_3}}~\underline{\underline{\boldsymbol{K}}}~\underline{\underline{\boldsymbol{A}_3}} = \begin{bmatrix} K_{11} & K_{12} & -K_{13} \\ K_{21} & K_{22} & -K_{23} \\
-K_{31} & -K_{32} & K_{33} \end{bmatrix}$$

The above relation implies that $K_{13} = K_{23} = K_{31} = K_{32} = 0$. Next consider a reflection $\underline{\underline{\boldsymbol{A}_2}}$ about the $1-3\,$ plane. We then have

$$\underline{\underline{\boldsymbol{K}}} = \underline{\underline{\boldsymbol{A}^T_2}}~\underline{\underline{\boldsymbol{K}}}~\underline{\underline{\boldsymbol{A}_2}} = \begin{bmatrix} K_{11} & -K_{12} & 0 \\ -K_{21} & K_{22} & 0 \\
0 & 0 & K_{33} \end{bmatrix}$$

That implies that $K_{12} = K_{21} = 0$. Therefore, the material properties of an orthotropic material are described by the matrix

$$\underline{\underline{\boldsymbol{K}}} =  \begin{bmatrix} K_{11} & 0 & 0 \\ 0 & K_{22} & 0 \\
0 & 0 & K_{33} \end{bmatrix}$$

== Orthotropy in linear elasticity ==
=== Anisotropic elasticity ===
In linear elasticity, the relation between stress and strain depend on the type of material under consideration. This relation is known as Hooke's law. For anisotropic materials Hooke's law can be written as

$$\boldsymbol{\sigma} = \mathsf{c}\cdot\boldsymbol{\varepsilon}$$

where $\boldsymbol{\sigma}$ is the stress tensor, $\boldsymbol{\varepsilon}$ is the strain tensor, and $\mathsf{c}$ is the elastic stiffness tensor. If the tensors in the above expression are described in terms of components with respect to an orthonormal coordinate system we can write

$$\sigma_{ij} = c_{ijk\ell}~ \varepsilon_{k\ell}$$

where summation has been assumed over repeated indices. Since the stress and strain tensors are symmetric, and since the stress-strain relation in linear elasticity can be derived from a strain energy density function, the following symmetries hold for linear elastic materials

$$c_{ijk\ell} = c_{jik\ell} ~,~~c_{ijk\ell} = c_{ij\ell k} ~,~~ c_{ijk\ell} = c_{k\ell ij} ~.$$

Because of the above symmetries, the stress-strain relation for linear elastic materials can be expressed in matrix form as

$$\begin{bmatrix}\sigma_{11}\\ \sigma_{22} \\ \sigma_{33} \\ \sigma_{23} \\ \sigma_{31} \\ \sigma_{12} \end{bmatrix} =
\begin{bmatrix} c_{1111} & c_{1122} & c_{1133} & c_{1123} & c_{1131} & c_{1112} \\
c_{2211} & c_{2222} & c_{2233} & c_{2223} & c_{2231} & c_{2212} \\
c_{3311} & c_{3322} & c_{3333} & c_{3323} & c_{3331} & c_{3312} \\
c_{2311} & c_{2322} & c_{2333} & c_{2323} & c_{2331} & c_{2312} \\
c_{3111} & c_{3122} & c_{3133} & c_{3123} & c_{3131} & c_{3112} \\
c_{1211} & c_{1222} & c_{1233} & c_{1223} & c_{1231} & c_{1212}
\end{bmatrix}
\begin{bmatrix}\varepsilon_{11}\\ \varepsilon_{22} \\ \varepsilon_{33} \\ 2\varepsilon_{23} \\ 2\varepsilon_{31} \\ 2\varepsilon_{12} \end{bmatrix}$$

An alternative representation in Voigt notation is

$$\begin{bmatrix} \sigma_1 \\ \sigma_2 \\ \sigma_3 \\ \sigma_4 \\ \sigma_5 \\ \sigma_6 \end{bmatrix} =
\begin{bmatrix}
C_{11} & C_{12} & C_{13} & C_{14} & C_{15} & C_{16} \\
C_{12} & C_{22} & C_{23} & C_{24} & C_{25} & C_{26} \\
C_{13} & C_{23} & C_{33} & C_{34} & C_{35} & C_{36} \\
C_{14} & C_{24} & C_{34} & C_{44} & C_{45} & C_{46} \\
C_{15} & C_{25} & C_{35} & C_{45} & C_{55} & C_{56} \\
C_{16} & C_{26} & C_{36} & C_{46} & C_{56} & C_{66} \end{bmatrix}
\begin{bmatrix} \varepsilon_1 \\ \varepsilon_2 \\ \varepsilon_3 \\ \varepsilon_4 \\ \varepsilon_5 \\ \varepsilon_6 \end{bmatrix}$$

or

$$\underline{\underline{\boldsymbol{\sigma}}} = \underline{\underline{\mathsf{C}}}~\underline{\underline{\boldsymbol{\varepsilon}}}$$

The stiffness matrix $\underline{\underline{\mathsf{C}}}$ in the above relation satisfies point symmetry.

=== Condition for material symmetry ===
The stiffness matrix $\underline{\underline{\mathsf{C}}}$ satisfies a given symmetry condition if it does not change when subjected to the corresponding orthogonal transformation. The orthogonal transformation may represent symmetry with respect to a point, an axis, or a plane. Orthogonal transformations in linear elasticity include rotations and reflections, but not shape changing transformations and can be represented, in orthonormal coordinates, by a $3\times 3$ matrix $\underline{\underline{\mathbf{A}}}$ given by

$$\underline{\underline{\mathbf{A}}} = \begin{bmatrix} A_{11} & A_{12} & A_{13} \\ A_{21} & A_{22} & A_{23} \\
A_{31} & A_{32} & A_{33} \end{bmatrix}~.$$

In Voigt notation, the transformation matrix for the stress tensor can be expressed as a $6\times6$ matrix $\underline{\underline{\mathsf{A}_\sigma}}$ given by

$$\underline{\underline{\mathsf{A}_\sigma}} = \begin{bmatrix}
A_{11}^2 & A_{12}^2 & A_{13}^2 & 2A_{12}A_{13} & 2A_{11}A_{13} & 2A_{11}A_{12} \\
A_{21}^2 & A_{22}^2 & A_{23}^2 & 2A_{22}A_{23} & 2A_{21}A_{23} & 2A_{21}A_{22} \\
A_{31}^2 & A_{32}^2 & A_{33}^2 & 2A_{32}A_{33} & 2A_{31}A_{33} & 2A_{31}A_{32} \\
A_{21}A_{31} & A_{22}A_{32} & A_{23}A_{33} & A_{22}A_{33}+A_{23}A_{32} & A_{21}A_{33}+A_{23}A_{31} & A_{21}A_{32}+A_{22}A_{31} \\
A_{11}A_{31} & A_{12}A_{32} & A_{13}A_{33} & A_{12}A_{33}+A_{13}A_{32} & A_{11}A_{33}+A_{13}A_{31} & A_{11}A_{32}+A_{12}A_{31} \\
A_{11}A_{21} & A_{12}A_{22} & A_{13}A_{23} & A_{12}A_{23}+A_{13}A_{22} & A_{11}A_{23}+A_{13}A_{21} & A_{11}A_{22}+A_{12}A_{21} \end{bmatrix}$$

The transformation for the strain tensor has a slightly different form because of the choice of notation. This transformation matrix is

$$\underline{\underline{\mathsf{A}_\varepsilon}} = \begin{bmatrix}
A_{11}^2 & A_{12}^2 & A_{13}^2 & A_{12}A_{13} & A_{11}A_{13} & A_{11}A_{12} \\
A_{21}^2 & A_{22}^2 & A_{23}^2 & A_{22}A_{23} & A_{21}A_{23} & A_{21}A_{22} \\
A_{31}^2 & A_{32}^2 & A_{33}^2 & A_{32}A_{33} & A_{31}A_{33} & A_{31}A_{32} \\
2A_{21}A_{31} & 2A_{22}A_{32} & 2A_{23}A_{33} & A_{22}A_{33}+A_{23}A_{32} & A_{21}A_{33}+A_{23}A_{31} & A_{21}A_{32}+A_{22}A_{31} \\
2A_{11}A_{31} & 2A_{12}A_{32} & 2A_{13}A_{33} & A_{12}A_{33}+A_{13}A_{32} & A_{11}A_{33}+A_{13}A_{31} & A_{11}A_{32}+A_{12}A_{31} \\
2A_{11}A_{21} & 2A_{12}A_{22} & 2A_{13}A_{23} & A_{12}A_{23}+A_{13}A_{22} & A_{11}A_{23}+A_{13}A_{21} & A_{11}A_{22}+A_{12}A_{21} \end{bmatrix}$$

It can be shown that $\underline{\underline{\mathsf{A}_\varepsilon}}^T = \underline{\underline{\mathsf{A}_\sigma}}^{-1}$.

The elastic properties of a continuum are invariant under an orthogonal transformation $\underline{\underline{\mathbf{A}}}$ if and only if

$$\underline{\underline{\mathsf{C}}} = \underline{\underline{\mathsf{A}_\varepsilon}}^T~\underline{\underline{\mathsf{C}}}~\underline{\underline{\mathsf{A}_\varepsilon}}$$

=== Stiffness and compliance matrices in orthotropic elasticity ===
An orthotropic elastic material has three orthogonal symmetry planes. If we choose an orthonormal coordinate system such that the axes coincide with the normals to the three symmetry planes, the transformation matrices are

$$\underline{\underline{\mathbf{A}_1}} = \begin{bmatrix}-1 & 0 & 0 \\ 0 & 1 & 0 \\ 0 & 0 & 1 \end{bmatrix} ~;~~
\underline{\underline{\mathbf{A}_2}} = \begin{bmatrix}1 & 0 & 0 \\ 0 & -1 & 0 \\ 0 & 0 & 1 \end{bmatrix} ~;~~
\underline{\underline{\mathbf{A}_3}} = \begin{bmatrix}1 & 0 & 0 \\ 0 & 1 & 0 \\ 0 & 0 & -1 \end{bmatrix}$$

We can show that if the matrix $\underline{\underline{\mathsf{C}}}$ for a linear elastic material is invariant under reflection about two orthogonal planes then it is also invariant under reflection about the third orthogonal plane.

If we consider the reflection $\underline{\underline{\mathbf{A}_3}}$ about the $1-2\,$ plane, then we have

$$\underline{\underline{\mathsf{A}_\varepsilon}} = \begin{bmatrix}
1 & 0 & 0 & 0 & 0 & 0 \\
0 & 1 & 0 & 0 & 0 & 0 \\
0 & 0 & 1 & 0 & 0 & 0 \\
0 & 0 & 0 & -1 & 0 & 0 \\
0 & 0 & 0 & 0 & -1 & 0 \\
0 & 0 & 0 & 0 & 0 & 1
\end{bmatrix}$$

Then the requirement $\underline{\underline{\mathsf{C}}} = \underline{\underline{\mathsf{A}_\varepsilon}}^T~\underline{\underline{\mathsf{C}}}~\underline{\underline{\mathsf{A}_\varepsilon}}$ implies that

$$\begin{bmatrix}
C_{11} & C_{12} & C_{13} & C_{14} & C_{15} & C_{16} \\
C_{12} & C_{22} & C_{23} & C_{24} & C_{25} & C_{26} \\
C_{13} & C_{23} & C_{33} & C_{34} & C_{35} & C_{36} \\
C_{14} & C_{24} & C_{34} & C_{44} & C_{45} & C_{46} \\
C_{15} & C_{25} & C_{35} & C_{45} & C_{55} & C_{56} \\
C_{16} & C_{26} & C_{36} & C_{46} & C_{56} & C_{66} \end{bmatrix} =
\begin{bmatrix}
C_{11} & C_{12} & C_{13} & -C_{14} & -C_{15} & C_{16} \\
C_{12} & C_{22} & C_{23} & -C_{24} & -C_{25} & C_{26} \\
C_{13} & C_{23} & C_{33} & -C_{34} & -C_{35} & C_{36} \\
-C_{14} & -C_{24} & -C_{34} & C_{44} & C_{45} & -C_{46} \\
-C_{15} & -C_{25} & -C_{35} & C_{45} & C_{55} & -C_{56} \\
C_{16} & C_{26} & C_{36} & -C_{46} & -C_{56} & C_{66} \end{bmatrix}$$

The above requirement can be satisfied only if

$$C_{14} = C_{15} = C_{24} = C_{25} = C_{34} = C_{35} = C_{46} = C_{56} = 0 ~.$$

Let us next consider the reflection $\underline{\underline{\mathbf{A}_2}}$ about the $1-3\,$ plane. In that case

$$\underline{\underline{\mathsf{A}_\varepsilon}} = \begin{bmatrix}
1 & 0 & 0 & 0 & 0 & 0 \\
0 & 1 & 0 & 0 & 0 & 0 \\
0 & 0 & 1 & 0 & 0 & 0 \\
0 & 0 & 0 & -1 & 0 & 0 \\
0 & 0 & 0 & 0 & 1 & 0 \\
0 & 0 & 0 & 0 & 0 & -1
\end{bmatrix}$$

Using the invariance condition again, we get the additional requirement that

$$C_{16} = C_{26} = C_{36} = C_{45} = 0 ~.$$

No further information can be obtained because the reflection about third symmetry plane is not independent of reflections about the planes that we have already considered. Therefore, the stiffness matrix of an orthotropic linear elastic material can be written as

$$\underline{\underline{\mathsf{C}}} =
\begin{bmatrix}
C_{11} & C_{12} & C_{13} & 0 & 0 & 0 \\
C_{12} & C_{22} & C_{23} & 0 & 0 & 0  \\
C_{13} & C_{23} & C_{33} & 0 & 0 & 0 \\
0 & 0 & 0  & C_{44} & 0 & 0 \\
0 & 0 & 0  & 0 & C_{55} & 0\\
0 & 0 & 0  & 0 & 0 & C_{66} \end{bmatrix}$$

The inverse of this matrix is commonly written as

$$\underline{\underline{\mathsf{S}}} =
\begin{bmatrix}
\tfrac{1}{E_{\rm 1}} & - \tfrac{\nu_{\rm 21}}{E_{\rm 2}} & - \tfrac{\nu_{\rm 31}}{E_{\rm 3}} & 0 & 0 & 0 \\
-\tfrac{\nu_{\rm 12}}{E_{\rm 1}} & \tfrac{1}{E_{\rm 2}} & - \tfrac{\nu_{\rm 32}}{E_{\rm 3}} & 0 & 0 & 0 \\
-\tfrac{\nu_{\rm 13}}{E_{\rm 1}} & - \tfrac{\nu_{\rm 23}}{E_{\rm 2}} & \tfrac{1}{E_{\rm 3}} & 0 & 0 & 0 \\
0 & 0 & 0 & \tfrac{1}{G_{\rm 23}} & 0 & 0 \\
0 & 0 & 0 & 0 & \tfrac{1}{G_{\rm 31}} & 0 \\
0 & 0 & 0 & 0 & 0 & \tfrac{1}{G_{\rm 12}} \\
\end{bmatrix}$$

where ${E}_{\rm i}\,$ is the Young's modulus along axis $i$, $G_{\rm ij}\,$ is the shear modulus in direction $j$ on the plane whose normal is in direction $i$, and $\nu_{\rm ij}\,$ is the Poisson's ratio that corresponds to a contraction in direction $j$ when an extension is applied in direction $i$. Only nine (9) from these twelve (12) elastic constants are independent.

=== Bounds on the moduli of orthotropic elastic materials ===
The strain-stress relation for orthotropic linear elastic materials can be written in Voigt notation as

$$\underline{\underline{\boldsymbol{\varepsilon}}} = \underline{\underline{\mathsf{S}}}~\underline{\underline{\boldsymbol{\sigma}}}$$

where the compliance matrix $\underline{\underline{\mathsf{S}}}$ is given by

$$\underline{\underline{\mathsf{S}}} =
\begin{bmatrix}
S_{11} & S_{12} & S_{13} & 0 & 0 & 0 \\
S_{12} & S_{22} & S_{23} & 0 & 0 & 0  \\
S_{13} & S_{23} & S_{33} & 0 & 0 & 0 \\
0 & 0 & 0  & S_{44} & 0 & 0 \\
0 & 0 & 0  & 0 & S_{55} & 0\\
0 & 0 & 0  & 0 & 0 & S_{66} \end{bmatrix}$$

The compliance matrix is symmetric and must be positive definite for the strain energy density to be positive. This implies from Sylvester's criterion that all the principal minors of the matrix are positive, i.e.,

$$\Delta_k := \det(\underline{\underline{\mathsf{S}_k}}) > 0$$

where $\underline{\underline{\mathsf{S}_k}}$ is the $k\times k$ principal submatrix of $\underline{\underline{\mathsf{S}}}$.

Then,

$$\begin{align}
\Delta_1 > 0  & \implies \quad S_{11} > 0 \\
\Delta_2 > 0  & \implies \quad S_{11}S_{22} - S_{12}^2 > 0 \\
\Delta_3 > 0  & \implies \quad (S_{11}S_{22}-S_{12}^2)S_{33}-S_{11}S_{23}^2+2S_{12}S_{23}S_{13}-S_{22}S_{13}^2 >0 \\
\Delta_4 > 0  & \implies \quad S_{44}\Delta_3 > 0 \implies S_{44} > 0\\
\Delta_5 > 0  & \implies \quad S_{44}S_{55}\Delta_3 > 0 \implies S_{55} > 0 \\
\Delta_6 > 0  & \implies \quad S_{44}S_{55}S_{66}\Delta_3 > 0 \implies S_{66} > 0
\end{align}$$

We can show that this set of conditions implies that

$$S_{11} > 0 ~,~~ S_{22} > 0 ~,~~ S_{33} > 0 ~,~~ S_{44} > 0 ~,~~ S_{55} > 0 ~,~~ S_{66} > 0$$

or

$$E_1 > 0 , E_2 > 0, E_3 > 0, G_{12} > 0 , G_{23} > 0, G_{13} > 0$$

However, no similar lower bounds can be placed on the values of the Poisson's ratios $\nu_{ij}$.

== See also ==
- Anisotropy
- Clinotropic material
- Stress (mechanics)
- Infinitesimal strain theory
- Finite strain theory
- Hooke's law
