= Clinotropic material =

In solid mechanics and elasticity, clinotropy (from Ancient Greek κλίνειν (klínein) 'to incline', and τροπή (tropḗ) 'twist') or oblique anisotropy refers to the property of certain anisotropic materials where no two or more perpendicular planes of symmetry can be found, indicating that they typically possess less symmetry than orthotropic materials. A clinotropic material is a type of material exhibiting clinotropy, whose mechanical properties—such as stiffness or strength—depend on direction, but in a more complex way than in other directional materials. In particular, the material behaves differently when measured in directions that are not symmetric with respect to a certain plane. This makes them a special case of anisotropic materials, which are materials that do not behave the same in all directions.

Clinotropic materials are important in fields like geology, materials science, and engineering, where understanding how a material reacts to forces from different directions is crucial. Unlike orthotropic materials, which have distinct properties along three main perpendicular axes (like wood), clinotropic materials vary continuously in directions around a plane, leading to a more intricate mechanical behavior.

== Formal characterization ==
All the types of anisotropy are characterized by a local symmetry group, which is a point group; and the invariance under this symmetry group lead that the mechanical behavior of a material is characterized by a number of elastic constants and algebraic invariants. Specifically, a clinotropic material has a low-symmetry internal structure, whose point symmetry group has a finite order different from $2^3$ or $2^4$ and does not contain the Klein four-group $K = \mathbb{Z}_2\times \mathbb{Z}_2$ as a subgroup. This represents the most general form of anisotropy in linear elastic media and often requires many distinct elastic constants to describe it. Unlike isotropic materials (identical properties in all directions) and orthotropic materials (distinct but constant properties along three orthogonal directions), clinotropic materials may require up to 21 independent elastic constants in their stiffness tensor (when expressed in reduced Voigt notation), reflecting the complete absence of structural symmetry in their mechanical behavior. There are several subclasses of clinotropic materials, requiring between 6 and 21 elastic constants. Clinotropic materials may exhibit trigonal symmetry (6 or 7 constants), monoclinic symmetry (13 constants), or triclinic symmetry (21 constants).

This type of anisotropy is associated with materials displaying trigonal, monoclinic, and triclinic crystal symmetry, as well as certain composites, rocks, or biological tissues with highly irregular or non-homogeneous microstructures. Due to their high complexity, clinotropic models are primarily used in contexts where accurately capturing directional variability in mechanical properties is essential, such as advanced simulations of heterogeneous media or material characterization in materials science and geophysics.

== Elastic behavior ==
=== Trigonal clinotropy ===
Trigonal symmetry represents the clinotropic case with the highest symmetry, requiring the fewest elastic constants—six in total. For a linearly elastic trigonal clinotropic material, the stress-strain relations, using Voigt notation, are given at each point by:

$$\begin{bmatrix}
\sigma_{xx} \\ \sigma_{yy} \\ \sigma_{zz} \\ \sigma_{yz}\\ \sigma_{xz}\\ \sigma_{xy} \end{bmatrix}
= \begin{bmatrix} C_{11} & C_{12} & C_{13} & C_{14} & 0 & 0 \\ C_{12} & C_{11} & C_{13} & -C_{14} & 0 & 0 \\
C_{13} & C_{13} & C_{33} & 0 & 0 & 0 \\ C_{14} & -C_{14} & 0 & C_{44} & 0 & 0 \\
0 & 0 & 0 & 0 & C_{44} & C_{14} \\ 0 & 0 & 0 & 0 & C_{14} & (C_{11}-C_{12})/2 \end{bmatrix}
\begin{bmatrix} \varepsilon_{xx} \\ \varepsilon_{yy} \\ \varepsilon_{zz} \\
\varepsilon_{yz} \\ \varepsilon_{xz} \\ \varepsilon_{xy} \end{bmatrix}$$

The compliance matrix (flexibility) providing the strain-stress relations has a form analogous to the stiffness matrix ($C_{ij}$) above.

=== Monoclinic clinotropy ===
Monoclinic symmetry is characterized by a single reflection plane. The low degree of symmetry results in highly directionally dependent behavior, requiring 13 elastic constants in total. A linearly elastic monoclinic clinotropic material is characterized by the following stress-strain relations:

$$\begin{bmatrix} \sigma_{xx} \\ \sigma_{yy} \\ \sigma_{zz} \\ \sigma_{yz}\\ \sigma_{xz}\\ \sigma_{xy} \end{bmatrix}
= \begin{bmatrix} C_{11} & C_{12} & C_{13} & 0 & 0 & C_{16} \\ C_{12} & C_{22} & C_{23} & 0 & 0 & C_{26} \\
C_{13} & C_{23} & C_{33} & 0 & 0 & C_{36}\\ 0 & 0 & 0 & C_{44} & C_{45} & 0 \\
0 & 0 & 0 & C_{45} & C_{55} & 0 \\ C_{16} & C_{26} & C_{36} & 0 & 0 & C_{66} \end{bmatrix}
\begin{bmatrix} \varepsilon_{xx} \\ \varepsilon_{yy} \\ \varepsilon_{zz} \\
\varepsilon_{yz} \\ \varepsilon_{xz} \\ \varepsilon_{xy} \end{bmatrix}$$

The compliance matrix has an analogous form. Adapting the notation typically used for orthotropic materials, the compliance matrix may be written as:

$$\begin{bmatrix} \varepsilon_{xx} \\ \varepsilon_{yy} \\ \varepsilon_{zz} \\
\varepsilon_{yz} \\ \varepsilon_{xz} \\ \varepsilon_{xy} \end{bmatrix} = \begin{bmatrix}
\tfrac{1}{E_1} & -\tfrac{\nu_{12}}{E_1} & -\tfrac{\nu_{13}}{E_1} & 0 & 0 & -\tfrac{\alpha_1}{E_1} \\
-\tfrac{\nu_{21}}{E_2} & \tfrac{1}{E_2} & - \tfrac{\nu_{23}}{E_2} & 0 & 0 & -\tfrac{\alpha_2}{E_2} \\
-\tfrac{\nu_{31}}{E_3} & - \tfrac{\nu_{32}}{E_3} & \tfrac{1}{E_3} & 0 & 0 & -\tfrac{\alpha_3}{E_3} \\
0 & 0 & 0 & \tfrac{1}{G_{23}} & -\tfrac{\beta_{23}}{G_{23}} & 0 \\
0 & 0 & 0 & -\tfrac{\beta_{31}}{G_{31}} & \tfrac{1}{G_{31}} & 0 \\
-\tfrac{\alpha_1}{E_1} & -\tfrac{\alpha_2}{E_2} & -\tfrac{\alpha_3}{E_3} & 0 & 0 & \tfrac{1}{G_{12}} \\
\end{bmatrix} \begin{bmatrix} \sigma_{xx} \\ \sigma_{yy} \\ \sigma_{zz} \\ \sigma_{yz}\\ \sigma_{xz}\\ \sigma_{xy} \end{bmatrix}$$

With the following constraints ensuring the matrix remains symmetric:

$$\frac{\nu_{ij}}{E_i} = \frac{\nu_{ji}}{E_j}, \quad \frac{\beta_{23}}{G_{23}} = \frac{\beta_{31}}{G_{31}}$$

The independent constants may be chosen as three Young's moduli ($E_1, E_2, E_3$), three Poisson's ratios ($\nu_{12}, \nu_{13}, \nu_{23}$), three shear moduli ($G_{12}, G_{13}, G_{23}$), and four additional constants ($\alpha_1,\alpha_2,\alpha_3,\beta_{23},$), totaling 13 independent elastic constants.

=== Triclinic clinotropy ===
This represents the highest degree of anisotropy, with a trivial symmetry group of order 2. Consequently, its stiffness matrix in Voigt notation has no zero components, requiring 21 elastic constants to define the stress-strain relations:

$$\begin{bmatrix}
\sigma_{xx} \\ \sigma_{yy} \\ \sigma_{zz} \\ \sigma_{yz}\\ \sigma_{xz}\\ \sigma_{xy} \end{bmatrix}
= \begin{bmatrix} C_{11} & C_{12} & C_{13} & C_{14} & C_{15} & C_{16} \\ C_{12} & C_{22} & C_{23} & C_{24} & C_{25} & C_{26} \\
C_{13} & C_{23} & C_{33} & C_{34} & C_{35} & C_{36}\\ C_{14} & C_{24} & C_{34} & C_{44} & C_{45} & C_{46} \\
C_{15} & C_{25} & C_{35} & C_{45} & C_{55} & C_{56} \\ C_{16} & C_{26} & C_{36} & C_{46} & C_{56} & C_{66} \end{bmatrix}
\begin{bmatrix} \varepsilon_{xx} \\ \varepsilon_{yy} \\ \varepsilon_{zz} \\
\varepsilon_{yz} \\ \varepsilon_{xz} \\ \varepsilon_{xy} \end{bmatrix}$$

== See also ==
- Orthotropic material
- Transverse isotropic material
- Anisotropic material
- Elasticity
