= Voigt notation =

Mathematical Concept

In mathematics, Voigt notation or Voigt form in multilinear algebra is a way to represent a symmetric tensor by reducing its order. There are a few variants and associated names for this idea: Mandel notation, Mandel–Voigt notation and Nye notation are others found. Kelvin notation is a revival by Helbig of old ideas of Lord Kelvin. The differences here lie in certain weights attached to the selected entries of the tensor. Nomenclature may vary according to what is traditional in the field of application. The notation is named after physicists Woldemar Voigt and John Nye.

For example, a 2×2 symmetric tensor X has only three distinct elements, the two on the diagonal and the other being off-diagonal. Thus its rank can be reduced by expressing it as a vector without loss of information:

$$X = \begin{bmatrix} x_{11} & x_{12} \\ x_{12} & x_{22} \end{bmatrix} = \begin{bmatrix} x_{1 1} \\ x_{2 2} \\ x_{1 2} \end{bmatrix}.$$

Voigt notation is used in materials science to simplify the representation of the rank-2 stress and strain tensors, and fourth-rank stiffness and compliance tensors.

The 3×3 stress and strain tensors in their full forms can be written as:

$$\boldsymbol{\sigma}=
\begin{bmatrix}
\sigma_{11} & \sigma_{12} & \sigma_{13} \\
\sigma_{21} & \sigma_{22} & \sigma_{23} \\
\sigma_{31} & \sigma_{32} & \sigma_{33}
\end{bmatrix} \quad$$
and
$$\quad \boldsymbol{\varepsilon}=
\begin{bmatrix}
\varepsilon_{11} & \varepsilon_{12} & \varepsilon_{13} \\
\varepsilon_{21} & \varepsilon_{22} & \varepsilon_{23} \\
\varepsilon_{31} & \varepsilon_{32} & \varepsilon_{33}
\end{bmatrix}$$.

Voigt notation then utilises the symmetry of these matrices ($\sigma_{12} = \sigma_{21}$ and so on) to express them instead as a 6×1 vector:

$$\underline\sigma = \begin{bmatrix} \sigma_1 \\ \sigma_2 \\ \sigma_3 \\ \sigma_4 \\ \sigma_5 \\ \sigma_6 \end{bmatrix} := \begin{bmatrix}\sigma_{11} \\ \sigma_{22} \\ \sigma_{33} \\ \sigma_{23} \\ \sigma_{13} \\ \sigma_{12} \end{bmatrix} \quad$$
and
$$\quad \underline\varepsilon = \begin{bmatrix} \varepsilon_1 \\ \varepsilon_2 \\ \varepsilon_3 \\ \varepsilon_4 \\ \varepsilon_5 \\ \varepsilon_6 \end{bmatrix} := \begin{bmatrix}\varepsilon_{11} \\ \varepsilon_{22} \\ \varepsilon_{33} \\ \gamma_{23} \\ \gamma_{13} \\ \gamma_{12} \end{bmatrix}$$

where $\gamma_{12}=2\varepsilon_{12}$, $\gamma_{23} = 2\varepsilon_{23}$, and $\gamma_{13} = 2\varepsilon_{13}$ are the engineering shear strains.

The benefit of using different representations for stress and strain is that the scalar invariance
$$\boldsymbol{\sigma}\cdot\boldsymbol{\varepsilon} = \sigma_{ij}\varepsilon_{ij} = \underline\sigma \cdot \underline\varepsilon$$
is preserved.

This notation now allows the three-dimensional symmetric fourth-order stiffness, $C$, and compliance, $S$, tensors to be reduced to 6×6 matrices:

$$C_{ijkl}  \Rightarrow C_{\alpha \beta} = \begin{bmatrix}
C_{11} & C_{12} & C_{13} & C_{14} & C_{15} & C_{16} \\
C_{12} & C_{22} & C_{23} & C_{24} & C_{25} & C_{26} \\
C_{13} & C_{23} & C_{33} & C_{34} & C_{35} & C_{36} \\
C_{14} & C_{24} & C_{34} & C_{44} & C_{45} & C_{46} \\
C_{15} & C_{25} & C_{35} & C_{45} & C_{55} & C_{56} \\
C_{16} & C_{26} & C_{36} & C_{46} & C_{56} & C_{66}
\end{bmatrix}.$$

== Mnemonic rule ==
A simple mnemonic rule for memorizing Voigt notation is as follows:

- Write down the second order tensor in matrix form (in the example, the stress tensor)
- Strike out the diagonal
- Continue on the third column
- Go back to the first element along the first row.

Voigt indexes are numbered consecutively from the starting point to the end (in the example, the numbers in blue).

The diagram below also shows the order of the indices:
$$\begin{matrix}
ij & =\\
\Downarrow & \\
\alpha  & =
\end{matrix}
\begin{matrix}
11 & 22 & 33 & 23,32 & 13,31 & 12,21 \\
\Downarrow & \Downarrow & \Downarrow & \Downarrow & \Downarrow & \Downarrow & \\
1  &2 &  3 &  4 &  5 & 6
\end{matrix}$$

== Mandel notation ==
For a symmetric tensor of second rank
$$\boldsymbol{\sigma}=
\begin{bmatrix}
\sigma_{11} & \sigma_{12} & \sigma_{13} \\
\sigma_{21} & \sigma_{22} & \sigma_{23} \\
\sigma_{31} & \sigma_{32} & \sigma_{33}
\end{bmatrix}$$
only six components are distinct, the three on the diagonal and the others being off-diagonal. Thus it can be expressed, in Mandel notation, as the vector
$$\tilde \sigma ^M =
\langle \sigma_{11},
\sigma_{22},
\sigma_{33},
\sqrt 2 \sigma_{23},
\sqrt 2 \sigma_{13},
\sqrt 2 \sigma_{12}
\rangle.$$

The main advantage of Mandel notation is to allow the use of the same conventional operations used with vectors, for example:
$$\tilde \sigma : \tilde \sigma = \tilde \sigma^M \cdot \tilde \sigma^M =
\sigma_{11}^2 +
\sigma_{22}^2 +
\sigma_{33}^2 +
2 \sigma_{23}^2 +
2 \sigma_{13}^2 +
2 \sigma_{12}^2.$$

A symmetric tensor of rank four satisfying $D_{ijkl} = D_{jikl}$ and $D_{ijkl} = D_{ijlk}$ has 81 components in three-dimensional space, but only 36 components are distinct. Thus, in Mandel notation, it can be expressed as
$$\tilde D^M =
\begin{pmatrix}
D_{1111} & D_{1122} & D_{1133}  & \sqrt 2 D_{1123} & \sqrt 2 D_{1113} & \sqrt 2 D_{1112} \\
D_{2211} & D_{2222} & D_{2233}  & \sqrt 2 D_{2223} & \sqrt 2 D_{2213} & \sqrt 2 D_{2212} \\
D_{3311} & D_{3322} & D_{3333}  & \sqrt 2 D_{3323} & \sqrt 2 D_{3313} & \sqrt 2 D_{3312} \\
\sqrt 2 D_{2311} & \sqrt 2 D_{2322} & \sqrt 2 D_{2333}  & 2 D_{2323} & 2 D_{2313} & 2 D_{2312} \\
\sqrt 2 D_{1311} & \sqrt 2 D_{1322} & \sqrt 2 D_{1333}  & 2 D_{1323} & 2 D_{1313} & 2 D_{1312} \\
\sqrt 2 D_{1211} & \sqrt 2 D_{1222} & \sqrt 2 D_{1233}  & 2 D_{1223} & 2 D_{1213} & 2 D_{1212} \\
\end{pmatrix}.$$

The factors $\sqrt 2$ and 2 ensure that the operations on fourth-order tensors with these symmetries are carried out by ordinary 6×6 matrix multiplication and matrix inversion: if $\tilde A^M$ and $\tilde B^M$ are the Mandel matrices of two such tensors $A$ and $B$, then the double contraction $A : B$ has the Mandel matrix $\tilde A^M \tilde B^M$, and the inverse $A^{-1}$ has the Mandel matrix $(\tilde A^M)^{-1}$. This does not hold for the 6×6 matrices of Voigt notation, which carry different factors depending on which quantities the tensor relates (for example, stress to strain, or strain to strain).

== Applications ==
It is useful, for example, in calculations involving constitutive models to simulate materials, such as the generalized Hooke's law, as well as finite element analysis, and Diffusion MRI.

Hooke's law has a symmetric fourth-order stiffness tensor with 81 components (3×3×3×3), but because the application of such a rank-4 tensor to a symmetric rank-2 tensor must yield another symmetric rank-2 tensor, not all of the 81 elements are independent. Voigt notation enables such a rank-4 tensor to be represented by a 6×6 matrix. However, Voigt's form does not preserve the sum of the squares, which in the case of Hooke's law has geometric significance. This explains why weights are introduced (to make the mapping an isometry).

A discussion of invariance of Voigt's notation and Mandel's notation can be found in Helnwein (2001).

== See also ==
- Vectorization (mathematics)
- Hooke's law
- Linear_elasticity#Anisotropic_homogeneous_media
