= Kinshasa power cable collapse =

2022 disaster in the DRC

- Date: 2 February 2022
- Location: Kinshasa, Democratic Republic of the Congo
- Type: power cable collapse
- Deaths: 26
- Injuries: 0

On 2 February 2022, a power cable collapsed in Kinshasa, Democratic Republic of the Congo, killing 26 people. The accident occurred at a market in Matadi-Kibala on the outskirts of the capital of the DRC. The cable fell onto houses and shoppers, with the live end landing in a ditch that was filled with rain from earlier in the day. The country's national electricity company said that it believed the cable broke because it had been hit by lightning.

The victims were mostly sellers and customers at the market, but some passers-by were also killed.

Kinshasa's governor Gentiny Ngobila promised to pass new laws prohibiting "anarchic construction" in response to the tragedy. The government paid and arranged for the victims' funerals.
