= Poisson number =

Poisson number can refer to:

- In mechanics, the reciprocal of Poisson's ratio. 1 / v.
- In statistics, a number drawn from a Poisson distribution
