= Leaky transform fault =

Transform fault producing new crust

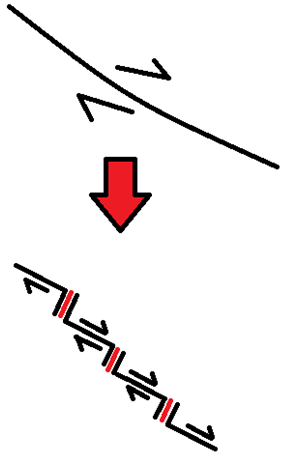
Break-up of a leaky transform into multiple smaller transforms.

A leaky transform fault is a transform fault with volcanic activity along a significant portion of its length producing new crust. In addition to the regular strike-slip motion observed at transform boundaries, an oblique extensional component is present, resulting in motion of the plates that is not parallel to the plate boundary. This opens the fault, allowing melt to break through and cool on the ocean floor, producing new crust. This extensional component can come from a slight shift in the position of a plate's Euler Pole. In order to accommodate oblique motion along the plate boundary, these leaky transform faults can break up into a series of small transforms linked by short segments of spreading ridges. These new transforms will follow small circles centred on the new Euler Pole.

== Case studies ==
The Western Limassol Forest Complex, an ophiolite assemblage on the island of Cyprus dated to the Late Cretaceous, is believed to have come from a leaky, left-lateral transform fault about 10 km (6.2 mi) wide. Structural deformation of dykes in the ophiolite complex indicates injection into a shearing environment; they trend N–S but are cut by E-W trending shear zones. These intrusions are likely syn-tectonic, as they both pass through and are cut by the shear zones.

The Emerald fracture zone (EMZ), located on the boundary of the Antarctic and Pacific plates to the south of New Zealand, is an ideal location to study extensional transform faults. The EMZ is proximal to the Euler Pole for Antarctic plate rotation about the Pacific, producing large effects on the boundary between the two plates as the pole migrated and relative plate velocities changed. Two main plate boundary reorganizations are evident in the EMZ, linked by large tectonic events. One at 30 My, potentially linked to the collision of India and Asia at 35 My, and a second at 6 My, potentially linked to the collision of the Ontong Java Plateau with the Melanesian arc at 10 My.

== Petrology ==
While the petrology of leaky transform faults has not been studied extensively, some detailed petrologic work has been done on the Siqueiros transform fault in the Eastern Pacific between the Pacific and Cocos plates. This region is host to young volcanic sites producing picritic basalt. These basalts have slight chemical variations from the typical mid-ocean ridge basalts found in the area; they are more primitive (higher MgO values) and are more depleted in incompatible elements.
