= Towing sock =

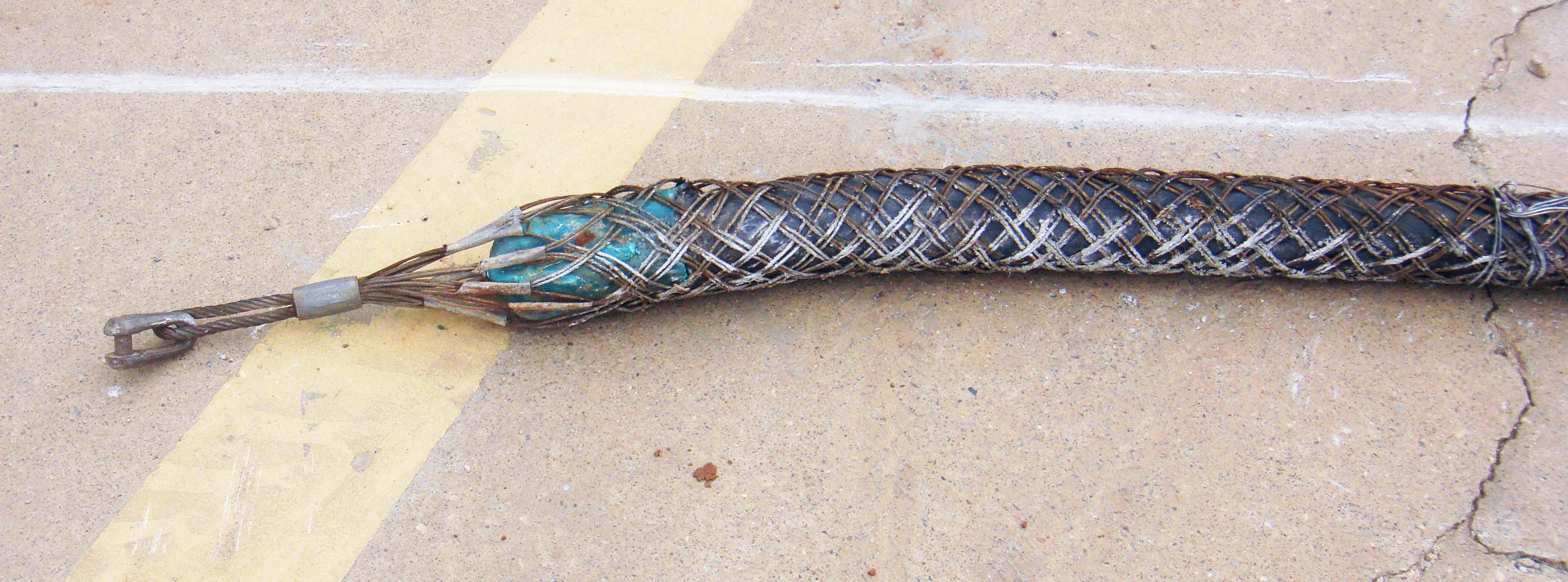
Towing sock

A towing sock or wire rope puller or wire pulling grip is a device that connects to the end of a cable, such as a power cable, in order to pull it through a tube or tunnel. It works by tightening around the cable when pulled, in the same manner as a Chinese finger trap. The towing sock is tubular and made of braided cable, open at one end and closed at the other where it connects to a tow line using an eye splice.

== Variants ==
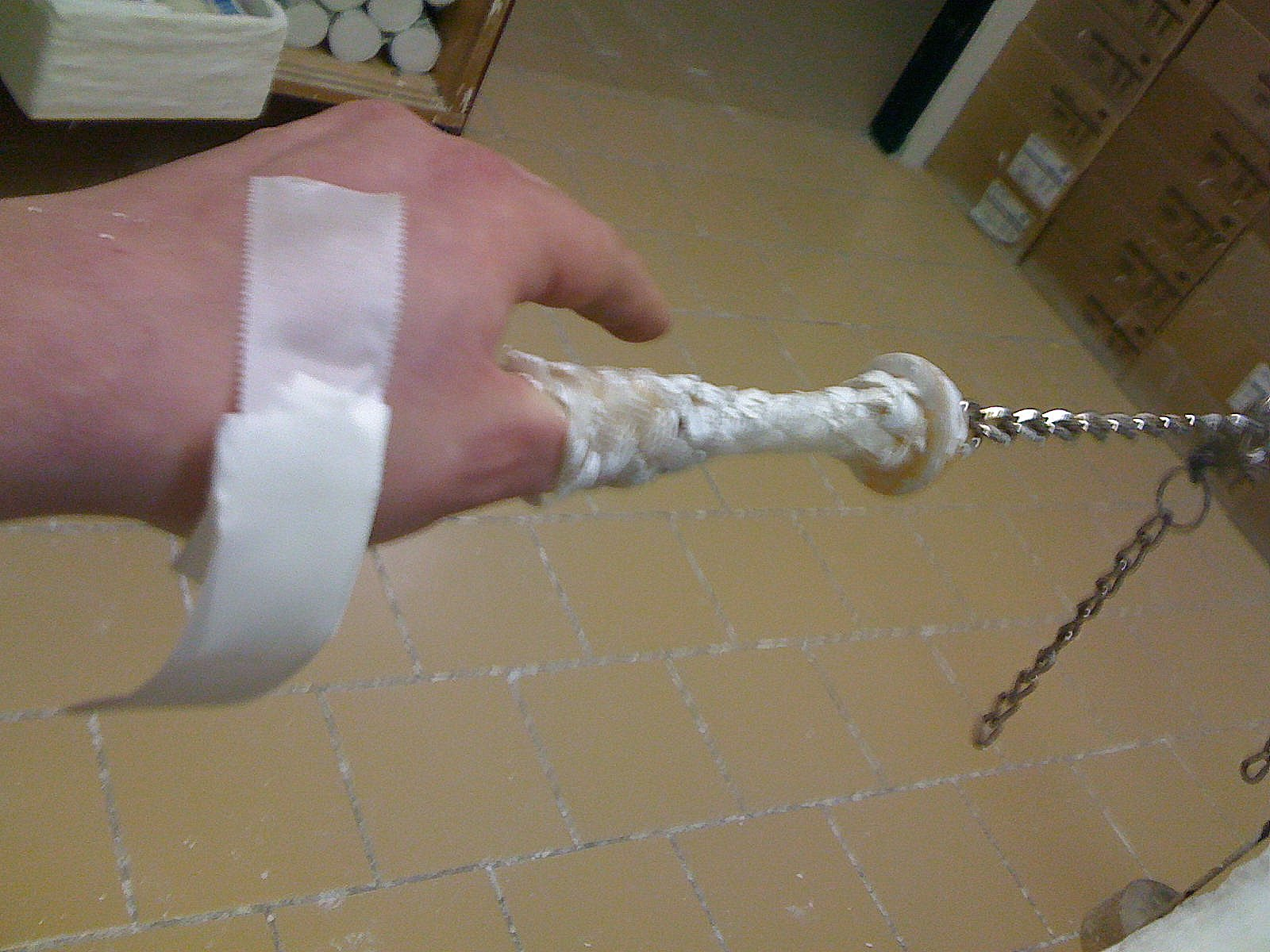
A similar device using the same principle, in this case used to straighten and fix a Bennett's fracture

Similar devices include a traction device used to treat a Bennett's fracture, a type of finger or thumb injury.

Also similar is the strain-relief grip which uses woven wire around the end of electrical wiring just before the terminal. It is placed there to prevent the wire from breaking. They are common in "drop" installations where electrical cables are attached to conduit on the ceiling and drop through space down to a machine or receptacle. Generally, the cable is attached to the electrical wiring near the ceiling in a normal manner, but a short distance away from the electrical connection there is a strain relief grip attached to an anchor point on the ceiling to hold the weight of the wire, though if the wire is not particularly heavy, the strain-relief grip may be attached directly to the rigid conduit.
