= Chinese finger trap =

Woven cylinder used as a prank device

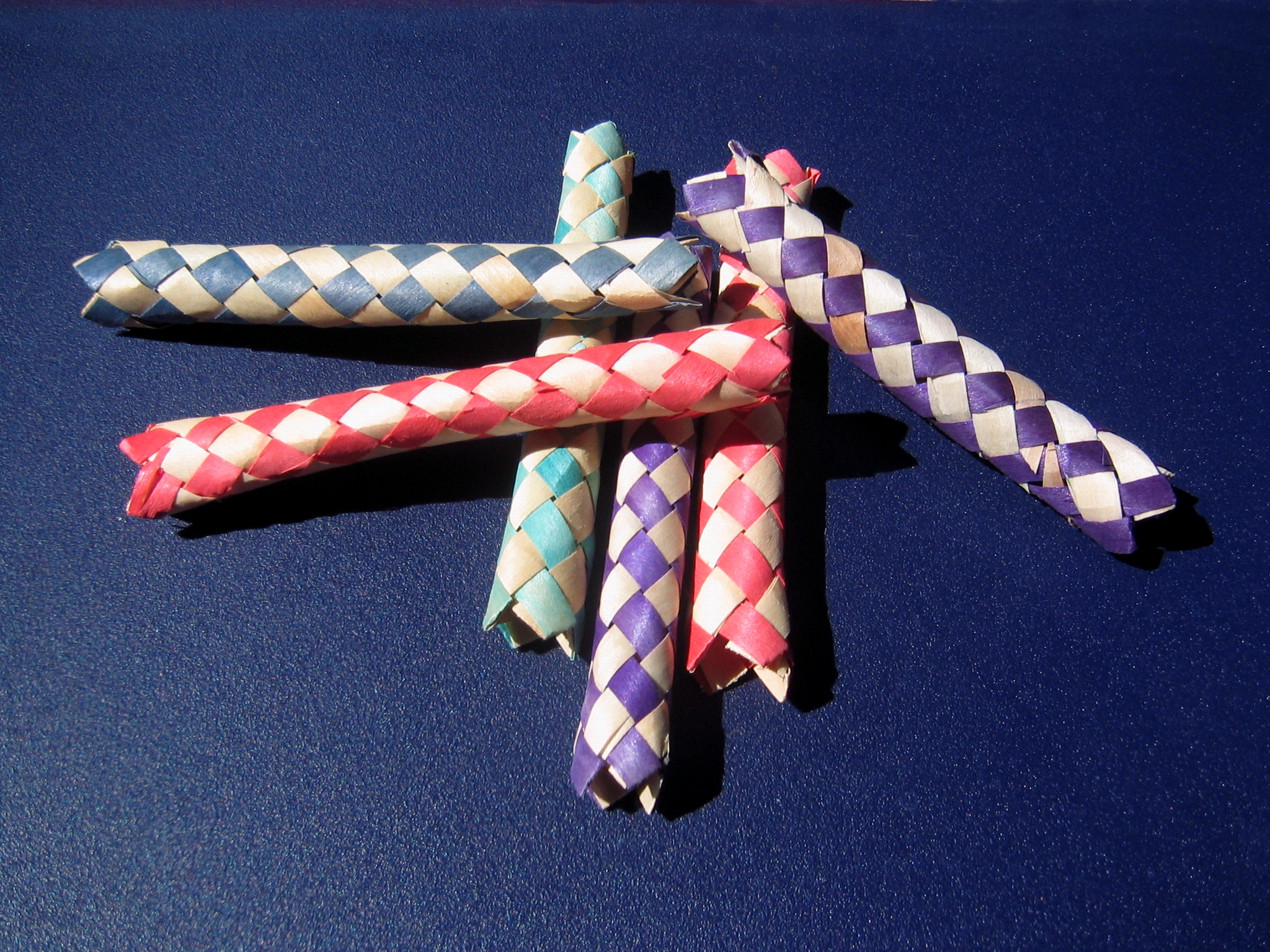
Chinese finger traps

A Chinese finger trap (also known as a Chinese finger puzzle, Chinese thumb cuff, Chinese handcuffs, and similar variants) is a gag toy used to play a practical joke on unsuspecting people. The finger trap is a simple puzzle that traps the victim's fingers in both ends of a small cylinder woven from bamboo. Despite the name, it is not of Chinese origin.

The initial reaction of the victim is often to pull their fingers outward, but this only tightens the trap. The key to escape the trap is to push the ends toward the middle, which enlarges the openings and frees the fingers.

== History ==
A single-ended version of the device, sold as a "girlfriend trap", has been available since at least 1870, back when it was recorded as Mädchenfänger or the German translation "Girl Catchers". The first recorded use of the term finger trap to characterize the toy was in 1900 in an American newspaper. The earliest known use of the term Chinese finger trap was in 1953, in an advertisement for the device in a newspaper in the American state of Ohio.

== Design ==
The tightening is simply a normal behavior of a cylindrical, helically wound braid, usually the common biaxial braid. Pulling the entire braid lengthens and narrows it. The length is gained by reducing the angle between the warp and weft threads at their crossing points, but this reduces the radial distance between opposing sides and hence the overall circumference. The more one pulls, the more the circumference shrinks and the trap tightens. The same effect is used in specialized textile manufacturing, the Vivien Kellems cable grip, Indonesian woven fruit presses, and by fly-fishers.

Chinese finger traps are not intended for use as restraint devices. Victims of the prank may break the bamboo strips through physical strength when they pull outwards, attempting to free their fingers and stretching the trap beyond its limits.

== Variants ==
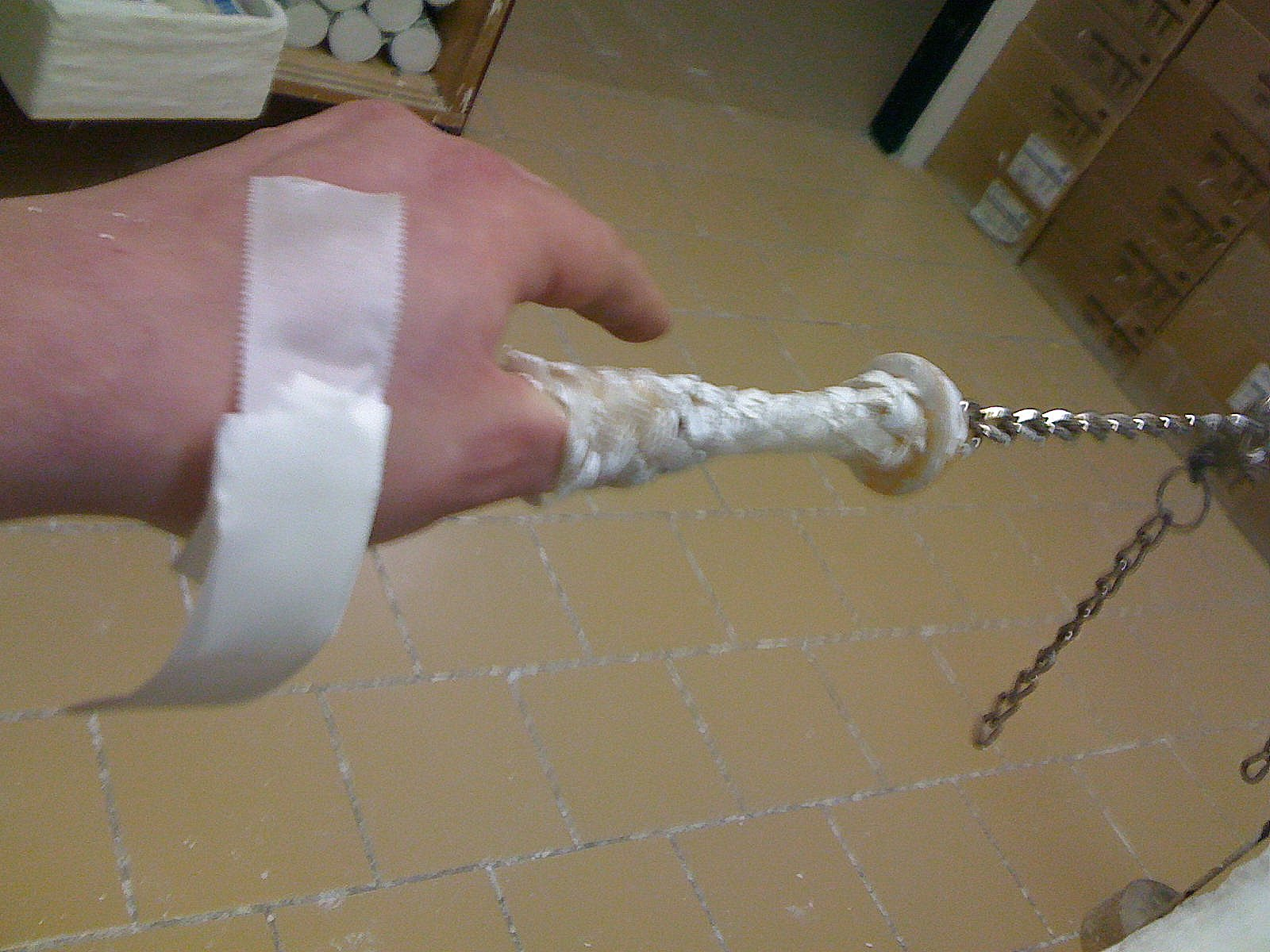
Chinese finger trap used to straighten and fix a Bennett's fracture

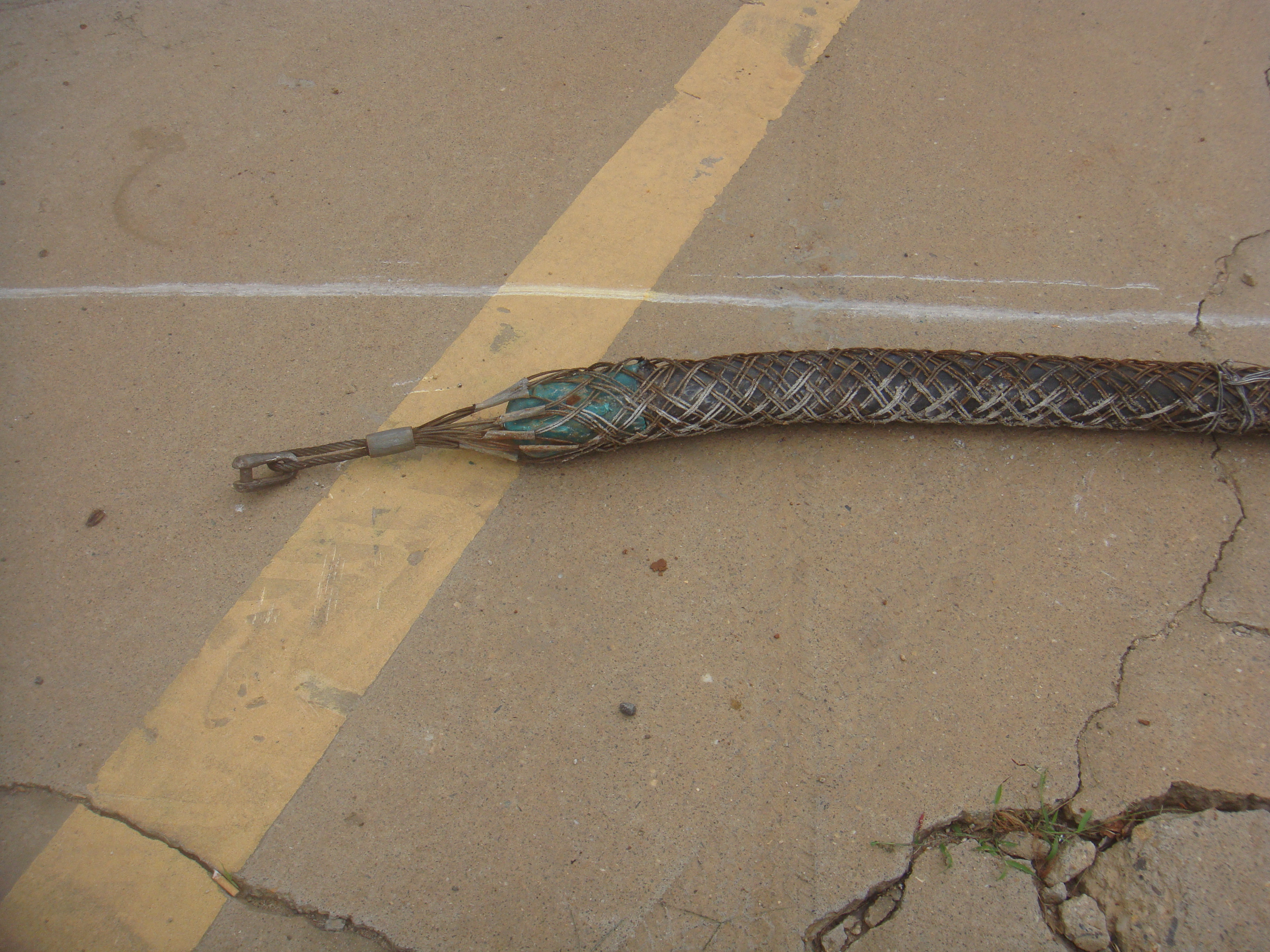
A towing sock used to pull cable through a tube

One variation on the Chinese finger trap has uses in orthopedic medicine—namely, providing even pressure to the patient's digit(s) and at the same time immobilizing the joints—and serves a similar purpose as a traction device. Its development goes back to Austria in 1870 when Dr. Steinberger, a dentist at the Rudolfsspital in Vienna, reported the discovery of his doctoral student Schmall, who got the idea to use the toy Mädchenfänger ("girl catcher") for the extension of fingers and arms. The principle was adapted for the use in surgery, and by 1873 was termed Schmall'sches Extensionsgeflecht ("Schmall's extension mesh").

Another variant is the towing sock. It uses the same principle to seize the end of a cable to be pulled through a tube or tunnel.

Parachute lines are often assembled using finger traps where the line is looped back into itself or another line.

== Cultural influence ==
The Chinese finger trap is a common metaphor for a problem that can be overcome by relaxing, i.e. not trying too hard to solve it; for example, in acceptance and commitment therapy.

The gag has been used in a number of films and television productions, such as the Stan Laurel short Dr. Pyckle and Mr. Pryde (1925); the Our Gang short Moan and Groan, Inc., where they are referred to as Japanese handcuffs (1929); "Romance on the Range" (1942); "The Beast with Twenty Fingers" episode of Dobie Gillis (1963); the Star Trek: The Next Generation episode "The Last Outpost" (1987); and The Simpsons episode "This Little Wiggy" (1998).

== See also ==
- Poisson's ratio
- Thumbcuffs
