= Teck cable =

Type of low-voltage armoured cable

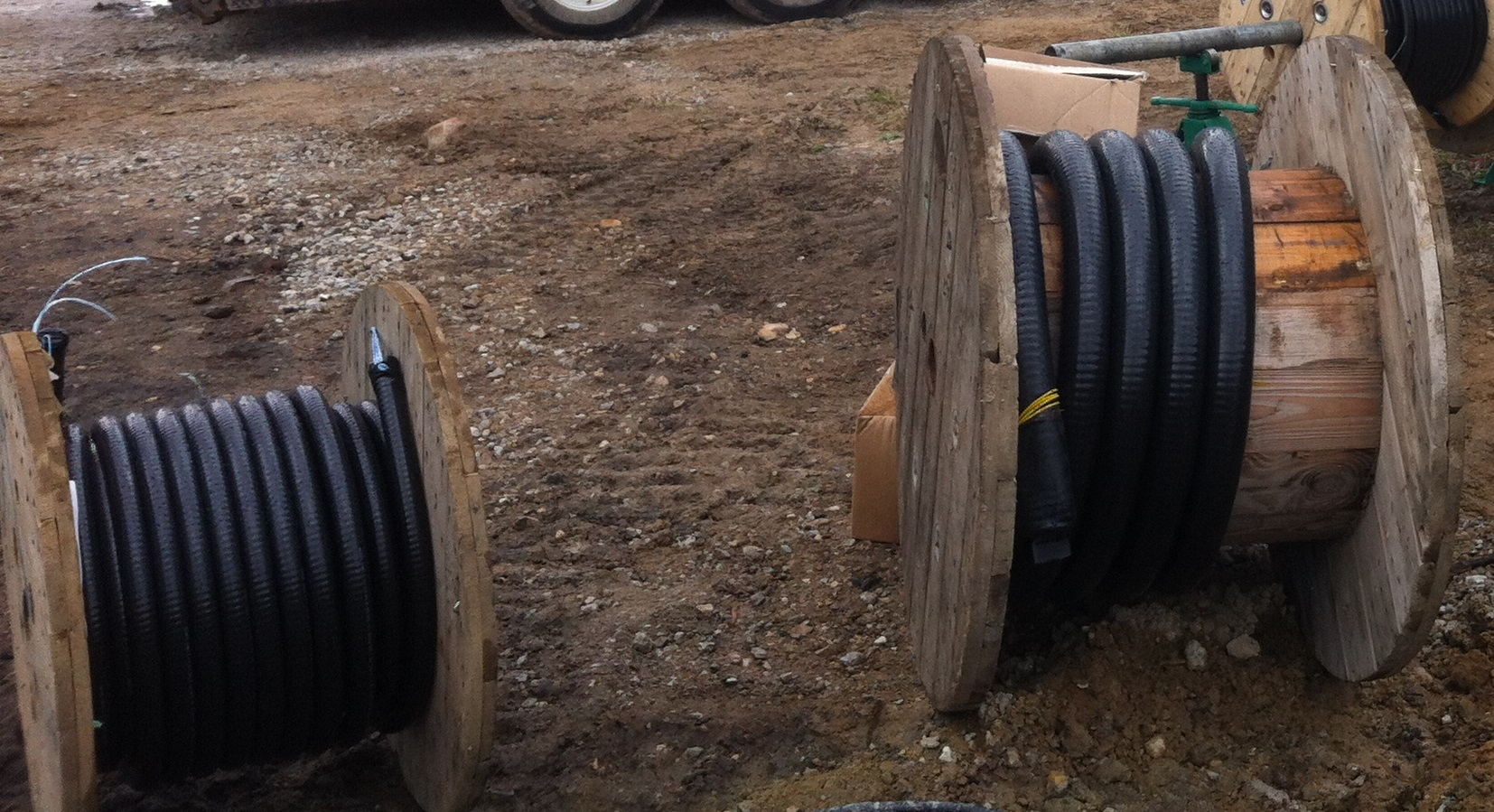
Teck cables on spools

Teck cable is a type of low voltage armoured cable. It was named after the location where it was first developed and used, Teck Township, now known as Kirkland Lake, Ontario. The mining operations such as those conducted by Teck-Hughes Gold Mining Ltd. required a durable cable to power equipment and withstand the demanding conditions, and teck cable was the engineered result.

In Canada, teck cable is defined by CSA standard C22.2 No. 131 and carries the type designation of TECK 90, the 90 referring to the maximum conductor temperature in degrees Celsius that the cable may be used at in a maximum 30 C ambient environment without de-rating its ampacity.

== Uses ==
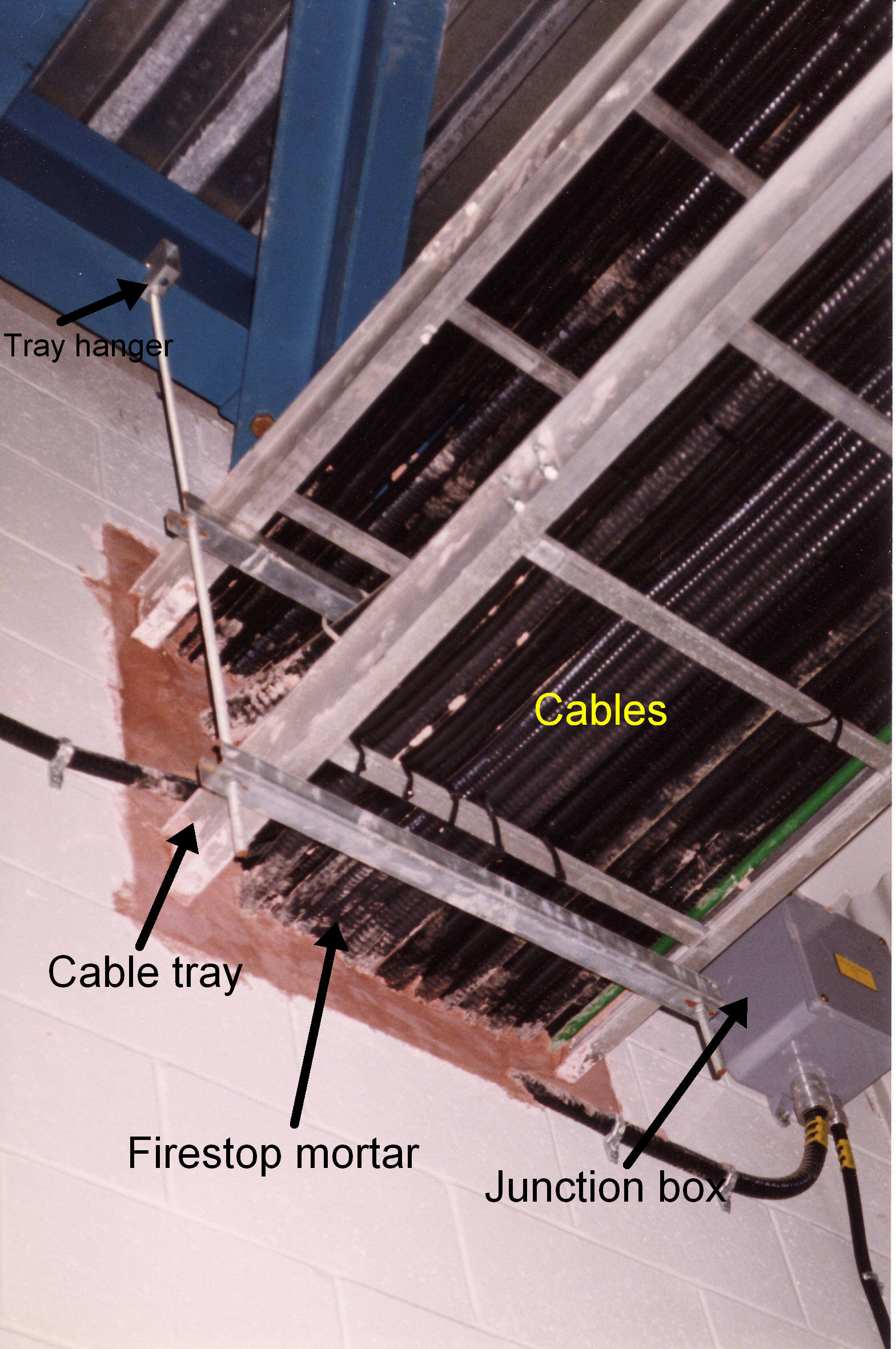
Teck cables in industrial installation

Teck cable is a very versatile power cable because it may be used where subject to limited mechanical damage, it is resistant to water, petrochemicals, and sunlight. It may be used for direct-earth burial and if properly sealed at the connection point, in explosive atmospheres such as gasoline dispensing stations.

When used in industrial environment, it is usually contained in a cable tray with many other cables powering the motors that run the industrial processes.

In the commercial environment, it may also be found in a tray, but is often fastened to a wall, truss, or other part of the building structure. It may be used to power any equipment such as compressors, heaters, or commercial dishwashers, and is also used for power distribution within buildings.

Teck cable may be used to power hot tubs, garages or other outbuildings, and sub-panels in the residential setting.

== Construction ==
Teck cable is composed of copper conductors sheathed in cross-linked polyethylene, bundled by plasticized PVC, wrapped in interlocking aluminum armour, all sealed by another coat of PVC.

== See also ==
- Modern mining
