= Telecommunications cable =

Bundles of wires used for transmitting information

Telecommunications cable is a type of guided transmission medium. Telecommunications are based on transmitting and receiving modulated waves/signals through a medium. Types of telecommunications cable include: electrical cables when electric current is carried; transmission lines and waveguides when electromagnetic waves are transmitted; optical fibers when light signals are transmitted.

When the distances involved are very short, the term signal cable may be used, for analog or digital communication. A data cable is used in digital data communications. Data cabling must conform to certain standards and best practices to ensure reliable performance and safety. When the distance between the transmitter and receiver is very far, an unguided or Wireless medium transmission may be used, based on antennas.

Examples include:

- Ethernet cables (Cat 5, Cat 5e, Cat 6, Cat 6A)
- Token Ring cables (Cat 4)
- Coaxial cable mainly used for analog communication, sometimes used as a baseband digital data cable, such as in serial digital interface and thicknet and thinnet.
- Optical fiber cable
- Serial cable and parallel cable
- Cat2 or telephone cord
- USB cable

== See also ==
- Networking cable
- Structured cabling
- Submarine communications cables
- Telecommunications power cable
- Wired communication
- Overhead cable
- Open wire
