= Wired communication =

Transmission of data over a wire-based communication

Wired communication refers to the transmission of data over a wire-based communication technology (telecommunication cables). Wired communication is also known as wireline communication. Examples include telephone networks, cable television or internet access, and fiber-optic communication. Most wired networks use Ethernet cables to transfer data between connected PCs. Also waveguide (electromagnetism), used for high-power applications, is considered wired line. Local telephone networks often form the basis for wired communications and are used by both residential and business customers in the area. Many networks today rely on the use of fiber optic communication technology as a means of providing clear signaling for both inbound and outbound transmissions and are replacing copper wire transmission. Fiber optic technology is capable of accommodating far more signals than copper wiring while still maintaining the integrity of the signal over longer distances.

Alternatively, communication technologies that don't rely on wires to transmit information (voice or data) are considered Wireless, and are generally considered to have higher latency and lower reliability.

The legal definition of most, if not all, Wireless technologies today or "apparatus, and services (among other things, the receipt, forwarding, and delivery of communications) incidental to such transmission" are a wire communication as defined in the Communications Act of 1934 in 47 U.S.C. §153 ¶(59). This makes everything online today and all Wireless phones a use of wire communications by law whether a physical connection to wire is visible or is not. The Communications Act of 1934 created the Federal Communications Commission to replace the Federal Radio Commission. If there were no real wired communications today, there would be no online and there would be no mobile phones. Satellite communications would be the only current technology considered Wireless.

In general, wired communications are considered to be the most stable and best of all types of communications services. They are relatively impervious to adverse weather conditions in comparison to wireless communication solutions. These characteristics have allowed wired communications to remain popular even as wireless solutions have continued to advance.

== See also ==
- Telecommunications cable
