= Power cable =

Bundle of wires for transmitting electricity

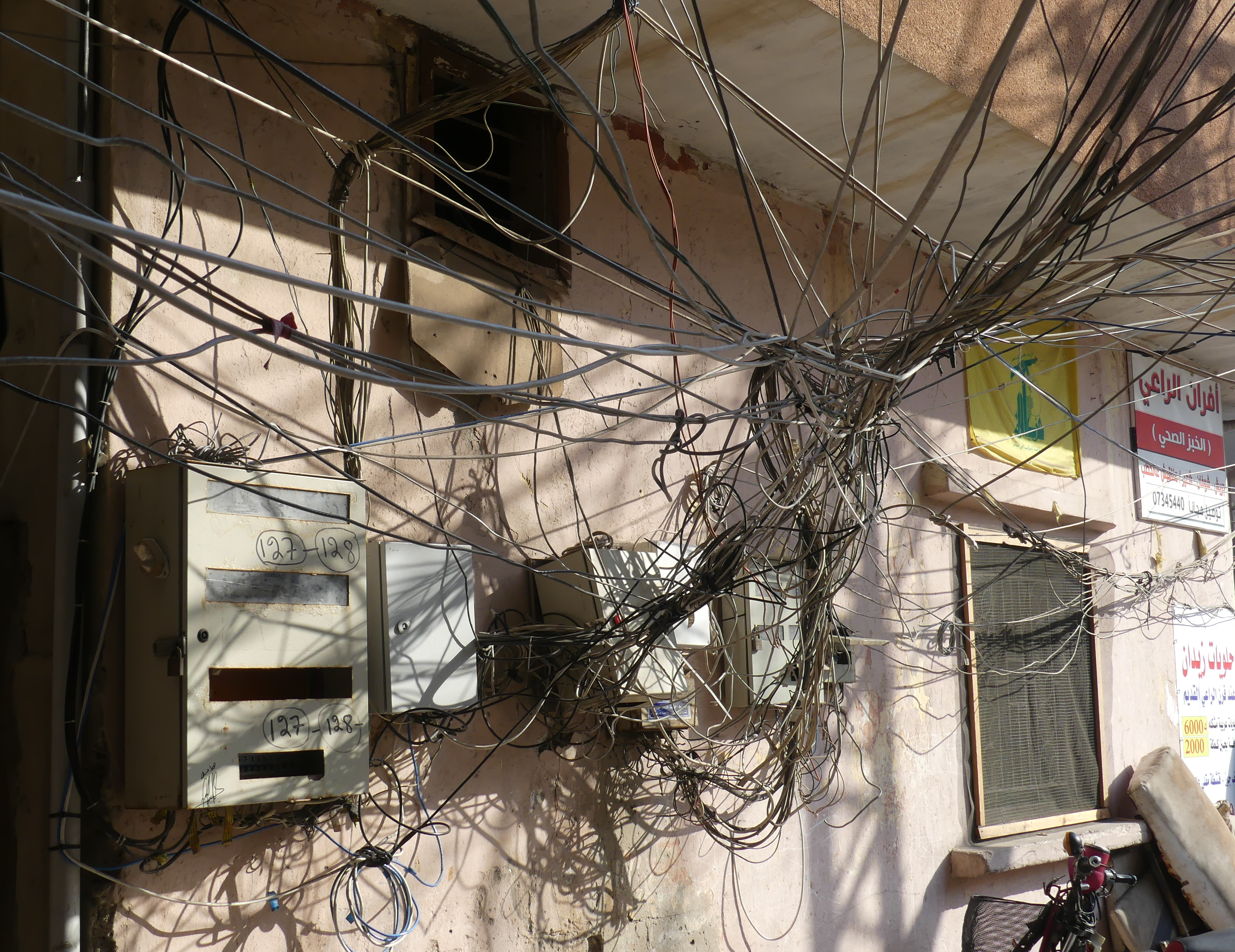
A messy rig of power cables in Tyre, Lebanon

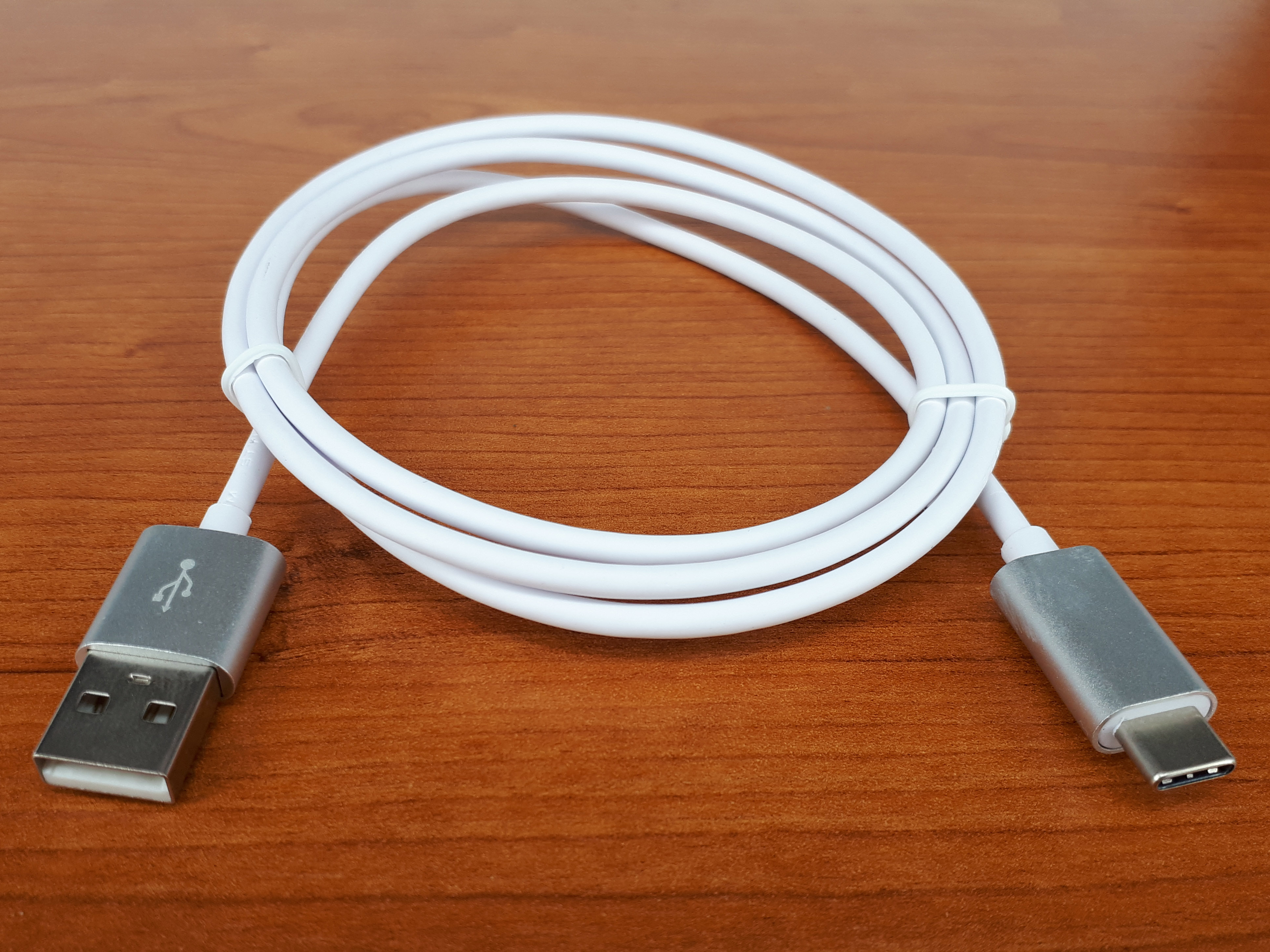
A USB cable, which carries power and data

A power cable is an electrical cable used specifically for transmission of electrical power. It is an assembly of one or more electrical conductors, usually held together in a single bundle with an insulating sheath, although some power cables are simply rigged as exposed live wires. Power cables may be detachable portable cords (typically coupled with adaptors), or installed as permanent wirings within buildings and structures, buried in the ground, laid underwater or run overhead. Power cables that are bundled inside thermoplastic sheathing and that are intended to be run inside a building are known as NM-B (nonmetallic sheathed building cable).

Small flexible power cables are used for electrical devices such as computers and peripherals, mobile devices, home appliances, light fixtures, power tools and machinery, as well as household lighting, heating, air conditioning and rooftop photovoltaic and home energy storage systems. Larger power cables are used for transmission of grid electricity to supply industrial, commercial and residential demands, as well as a significant portion of mass transit and freight transport (particularly rail transport).

== History ==
The first power distribution system developed by Thomas Edison in 1882 in New York City used copper rods, wrapped in jute and placed in rigid pipes filled with a bituminous compound. Although vulcanized rubber had been patented by Charles Goodyear in 1844, it was not applied to cable insulation until the 1880s, when it was used for lighting circuits. In 1897, rubber-insulated cable was used for 11,000-volt circuits that were installed for the Niagara Falls power project.

Mass-impregnated paper-insulated medium-voltage cables were commercially practical by 1895. During World War II, several varieties of synthetic rubber and polyethylene insulation were applied to cables.

Typical residential and office construction in North America has gone through several technologies:

- Early bare and cloth-covered wires installed with staples
- Knob and tube wiring, 1880s–1930s, using asphalt-saturated cloth or later rubber insulation
- Armored cable, known by the genericized trademark "BX" – flexible steel sheath with two cloth-covered, rubber-insulated conductors – introduced in 1906 but more expensive than open single conductors
- Rubber-insulated wires with jackets of woven cotton cloth (usually impregnated with tar), waxed paper filler – introduced in 1922
- Modern two or three-wire+ground PVC-insulated cable (e.g., NM-B), produced by such brands as Romex
- Aluminum wire was used in the 1960s and 1970s as a cheap replacement for copper and is still used today, but this is now considered unsafe without proper installation, due to corrosion, softness and creeping of connection.
- Asbestos was used as an electrical insulator in some cloth wires from the 1920s to 1970s, but discontinued due to its health risk.
- Teck cable, a PVC-sheathed armored cable

== Construction ==
Modern power cables come in a variety of sizes, materials, and types, each particularly adapted to its uses. Large single insulated conductors are also sometimes called power cables in the industry.

Cables consist of three major components: conductors, insulation, and a protective jacket or sheath. The makeup of individual cables varies according to application. The construction and material are determined by three main factors:

- Working voltage, determining the thickness of the insulation;
- Current-carrying capacity, determining the cross-sectional size of the conductor(s);
- Environmental conditions such as temperature, water, chemical or sunlight exposure, and mechanical impact, determining the form and composition of the outer cable jacket.

Cables for direct burial or for exposed installations may also include metal armor in the form of wires spiraled around the cable, or a corrugated tape wrapped around it. The armor may be made of steel or aluminum, and although connected to earth ground is not intended to carry current during normal operation. Electrical power cables are sometimes installed in raceways, including electrical conduit and cable trays, which may contain one or more conductors. When it is intended to be used inside a building, nonmetallic sheathed building cable (NM-B) consists of two or more wire conductors (plus a grounding conductor) enclosed inside a thermoplastic insulation sheath that is heat-resistant. It has advantages over armored building cable because it is lighter, easier to handle, and its sheathing is easier to work with.

Power cables use stranded copper or aluminum conductors, although small power cables may use solid conductors in sizes of up to 1/0. (For a detailed discussion on copper cables, see: Copper wire and cable.). The cable may include uninsulated conductors used for the circuit neutral or for ground (earth) connection. The grounding conductor connects the equipment's enclosure/chassis to ground for protection from electric shock. These uninsulated versions are known are bare conductors or tinned bare conductors. The overall assembly may be round or flat. Non-conducting filler strands may be added to the assembly to maintain its shape. Filler materials can be made in non-hydroscopic versions if required for the application.

Special purpose power cables for overhead applications are often bound to a high strength alloy, ACSR, or alumoweld messenger. This cable is called aerial cable or pre-assembled aerial cable (PAC). PAC can be ordered unjacketed, however, this is less common in recent years due to the low added cost of supplying a polymeric jacket. For vertical applications the cable may include armor wires on top of the jacket, steel or Kevlar. The armor wires are attached to supporting plates periodically to help support the weight of the cable. A supporting plate may be included on each floor of the building, tower, or structure. This cable would be called an armored riser cable. For shorter vertical transitions (perhaps 30–150 feet) an unarmored cable can be used in conjunction with basket (Kellum) grips or even specially designed duct plugs.

Material specification for the cable's jacket will often consider resistance to water, oil, sunlight, underground conditions, chemical vapors, impact, fire, or high temperatures. In nuclear industry applications the cable may have special requirements for ionizing radiation resistance. Cable materials for a transit application may be specified not to produce large amounts of smoke if burned (low smoke zero halogen). Cables intended for direct burial must consider damage from backfill or dig-ins. HDPE or polypropylene jackets are common for this use. Cables intended for subway (underground vaults) may consider oil, fire resistance, or low smoke as a priority. Few cables these days still employ an overall lead sheath. However, some utilities may still install paper-insulated lead-covered cable in distribution circuits. Transmission or submarine cables are more likely to use lead sheaths. However, lead is in decline and few manufacturers exist today to produce such items. When cables must run where exposed to mechanical damage (industrial sites), they may be protected with flexible steel tape or wire armor, which may also be covered by a water-resistant jacket.

A hybrid cable can include conductors for control signals or may also include optical fibers for data.

=== Higher voltages ===
For circuits operating at or above 2000 volts between conductors, a conductive shield should surround the conductor's insulation. This equalizes electrical stress on the cable insulation. This technique was patented by Martin Hochstadter in 1916; the shield is sometimes called a Hochstadter shield. Aside from the semiconductive ("semicon") insulation shield, there will also be a conductor shield. The conductor shield may be semiconductive (usually) or nonconducting. The purpose of the conductor shield is similar to the insulation shield: It is a void filler and voltage stress equalizer.

To drain off stray voltage, a metallic shield will be placed over the "semicon." This shield is intended to "make safe" the cable by pulling the voltage on the outside of the insulation down to zero (or at least under the OSHA limit of 50 volts). This metallic shield can consist of a thin copper tape, concentric drain wires, flat straps, lead sheath, or other designs. The metallic shields of a cable are connected to earth ground at the ends of the cable, and possibly locations along the length if voltage rise during faults would be dangerous. Multi-point grounding is the most common way to ground the cable's shield. Some special applications require shield breaks to limit circulating currents during the normal operations of the circuit. Circuits with shield breaks could be single or multi point grounded. Special engineering situations may require cross bonding.

Liquid or gas filled cables are still employed in distribution and transmission systems today. Cables of 10 kV or higher may be insulated with oil and paper, and are run in a rigid steel pipe, semi-rigid aluminum or lead sheath. For higher voltages the oil may be kept under pressure to prevent formation of voids that would allow partial discharges within the cable insulation.

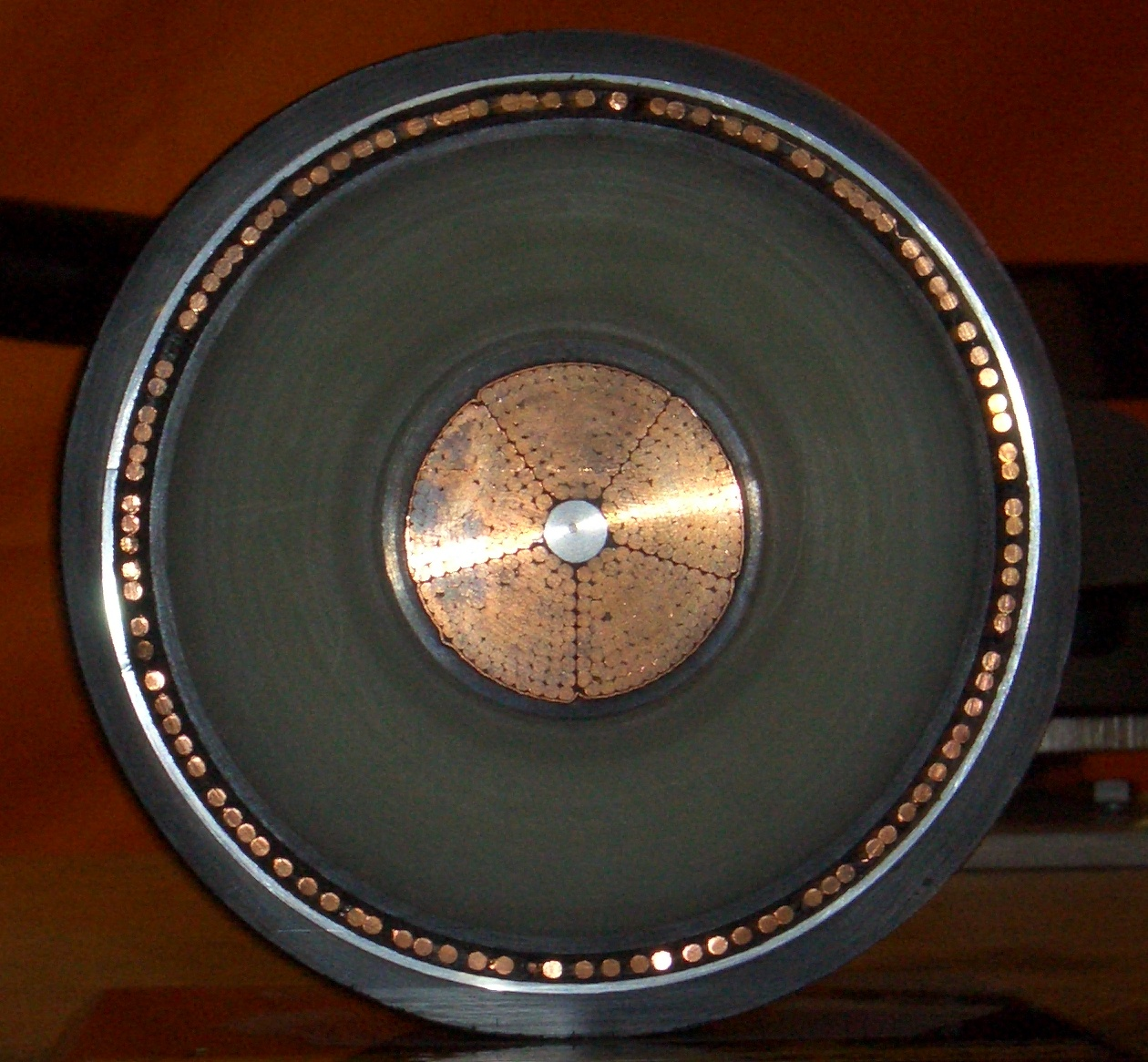
A high-voltage cable designed for 400 kV. The large conductor in the center carries the current; smaller conductors on the outside act as a shield to equalize the voltage stress in the thick polyethylene insulation layer.

Liquid filled cables are known for extremely long service lives with little to no outages. Unfortunately, oil leaks into soil and bodies of water are of grave concern and maintaining a fleet of the needed pumping stations is a drain on the operations and maintenance budget of most power utilities. Pipe-type cables are often converted to solid insulation circuit at the end of their service life despite a shorter expected service life.

Modern high-voltage cables use polyethylene or other polymers, including XLPE, for insulation, and require special techniques for jointing and terminating.

== Flexibility of cables (stranding class) ==
Most electrical cables are somewhat flexible, allowing them to be shipped to installation sites wound on reels, drums or hand coils. Flexibility is an important factor in determining the appropriate stranding class of the cable as it directly affects the minimum bending radius. Power cables are generally stranding class 1, 2, 5 or 6 according to IEC 60228.

Class 1 (Solid Conductors)

These conductors are made from a single round wire, either bare or metal-coated, usually between 0.5 mm^{2} and 16 mm^{2}. They are used primarily in fixed installations where flexibility is not required.

Class 2 (Stranded Conductors)

Composed of multiple wires twisted together (bare or coated), Class 2 conductors provide moderate flexibility and are available in circular, compacted circular, or sectoral forms.

Class 5 (Flexible)

Used in installations with low bending radii or moderate motion. Examples: H05V-K, H07V-K, H05Z1-K, H07Z1-K, H03VV-F, H05VV-F, H05VV5-F, H05VVC4V5-K, H05VVH6-F, H05RR-F, H07RN-F, 052XZI-F

Class 6 (Extra Flexible)

For dynamic or high-motion use (e.g., welding, robotics). Examples: H01N2-D, H01N2-E

Flexible cords contain fine stranded conductors, rope lay or bunch stranded. They feature overall jackets with appropriate amounts of filler materials to improve their flexibility, trainability, and durability. Heavy duty flexible power cords such as those feeding a mine face cutting machine are carefully engineered—their life is measured in weeks. Very flexible power cables are used in automated machinery, robotics, and machine tools. See power cord and extension cable for further description of flexible power cables. Other types of flexible cable include twisted pair, extensible, coaxial, shielded, and communication cable.

An X-ray cable is a special type of flexible high-voltage cable.

== See also ==
- AC power plugs and sockets
- American wire gauge – for a table of cross section sizes
- Ampacity – for a description of current carrying capacity of wires and cables
- Cross-linked polyethylene
- Electrical cable
- Ethylene propylene rubber (EPR)
- Industrial and multiphase power plugs and sockets
- Overhead power line
- Portable cord
- Railway electrification system
- Restriction of Hazardous Substances Directive
- Telecommunications power cable
- Voltage drop – another consideration when selecting proper cable sizes
