= Cutting machine =

Machine for cutting food or materials

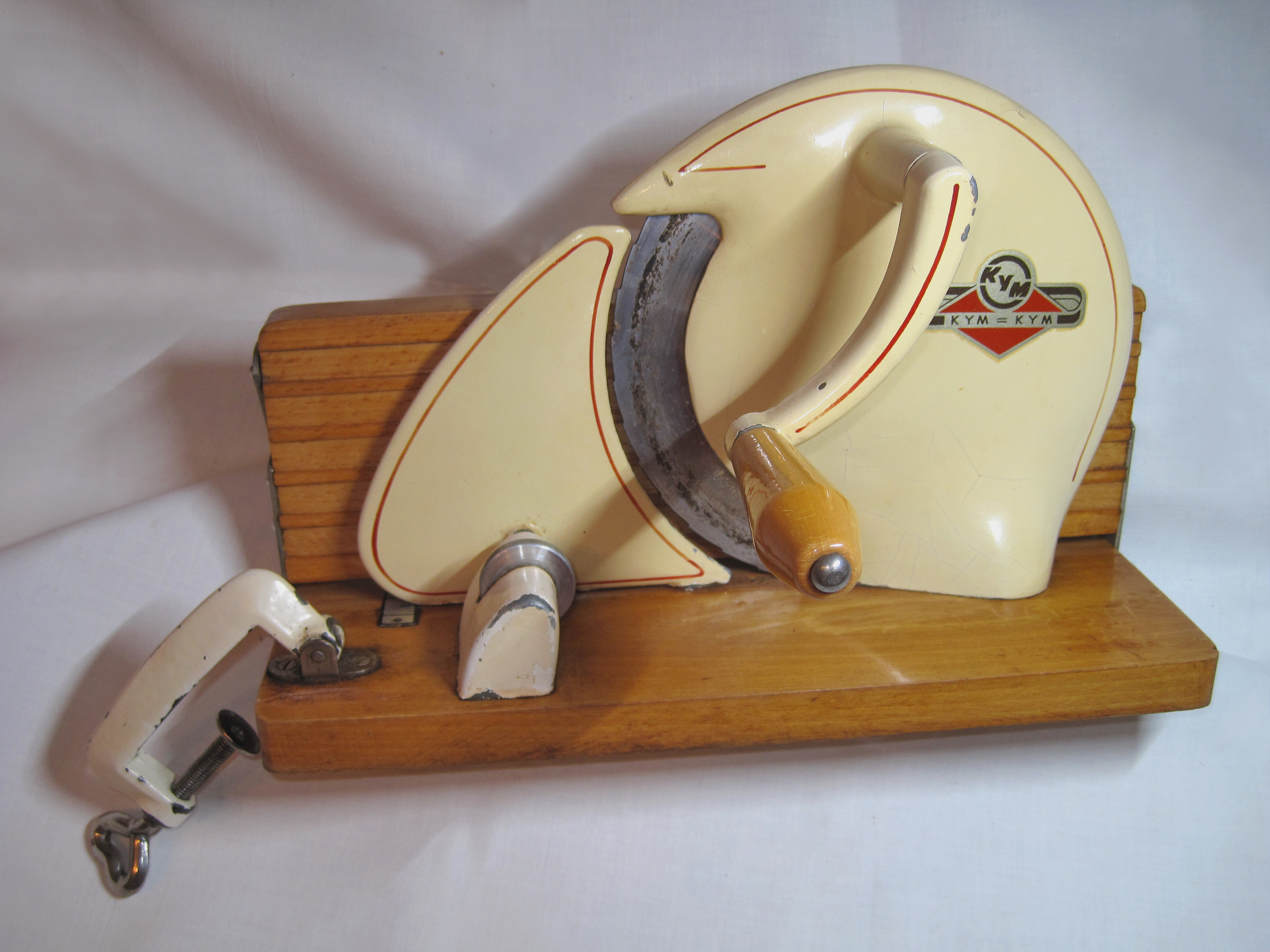
German Brotschneidemaschine, 'Bread cutting machine'

A cutting machine is a machine that cuts food mechanically or electrically. It can also be used to cut through materials.

== Types of cutting machines ==
There are multiple types of cutting machines. The most prominent ones are used for cutting food such as bread or meat, specifically meat slicers and bread cutting machines.

=== Meat slicers ===
Meat slicers use a rotating circular blade that is fixed on one side, while the material being cut is moved. They're sometimes also referred to as all-purpose slicers.

=== Bread cutting machines ===
Bread cutting machines usually work differently with industrial machines having blades passing through the bread. Home-use machines can slice the bread by guiding it along a mechanically rotating circular blade or pushing a blade through the bread. The first bread cutting machine was invented by Willy Abel from Berlin, while the first automatic one was invented in 1927 by American engineer Otto Frederick Rohwedder.

=== Shears ===
There are also machines not used for food but materials such as paper or silver.

=== Microtomes ===
In science, types of cutting machines used are called microtomes.

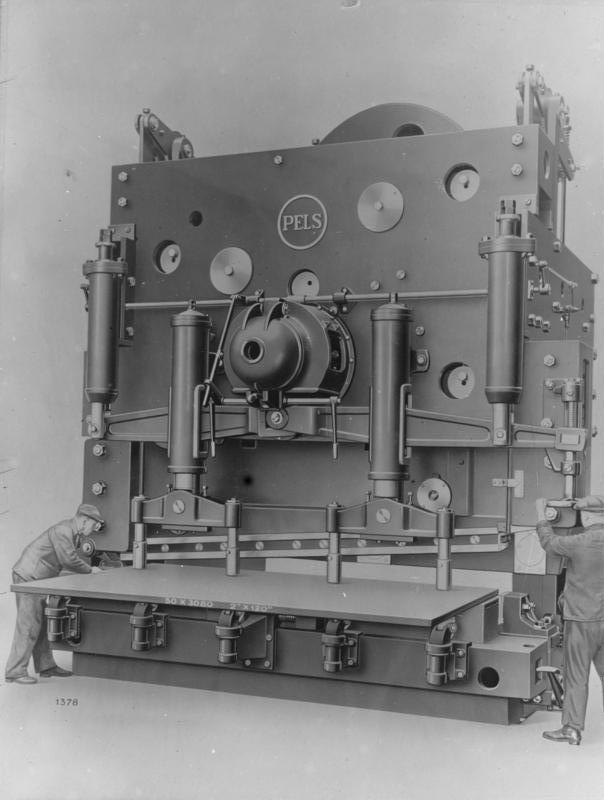
Planing cutter used for sheet metal

== Gallery ==
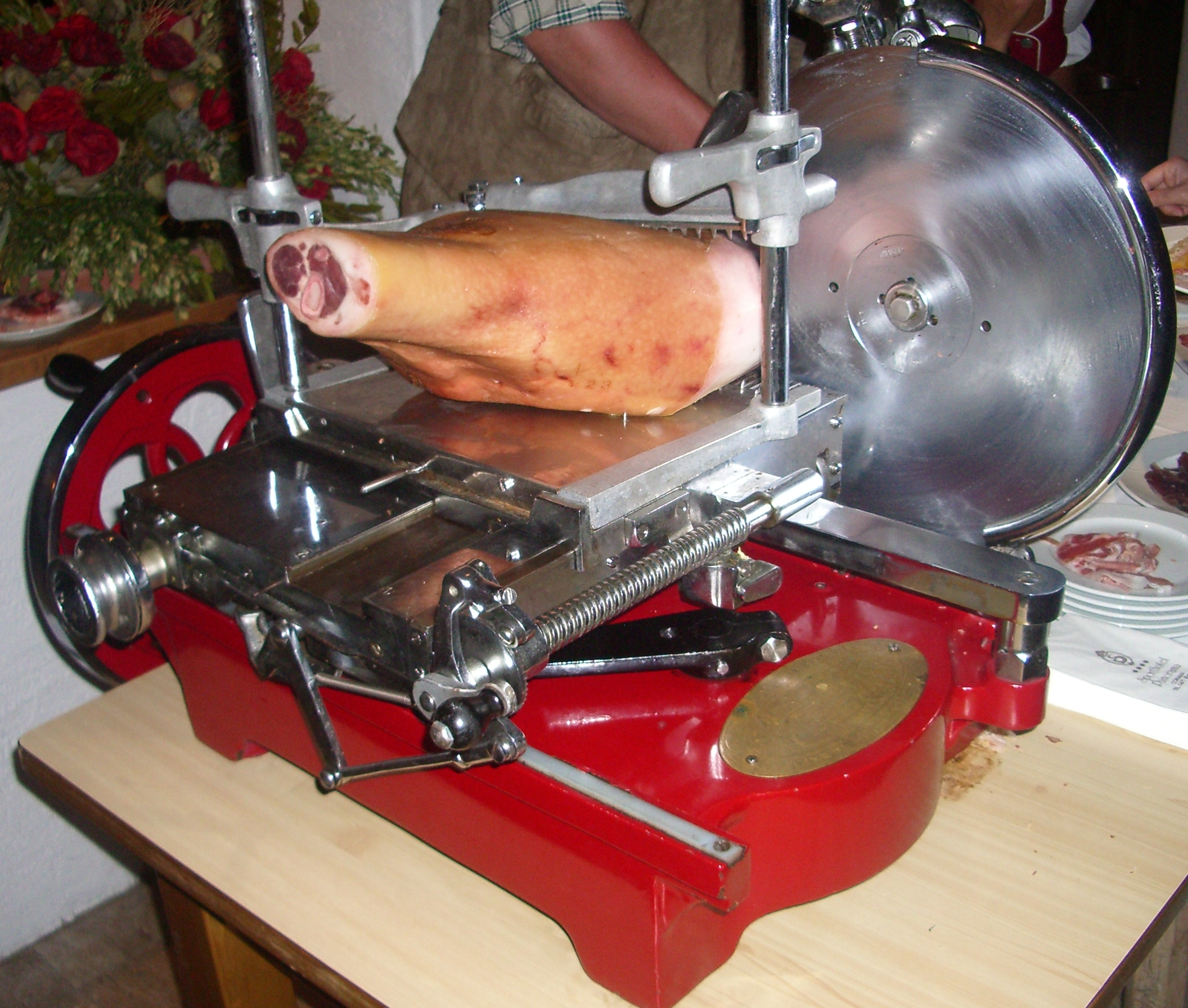
Meat slicer

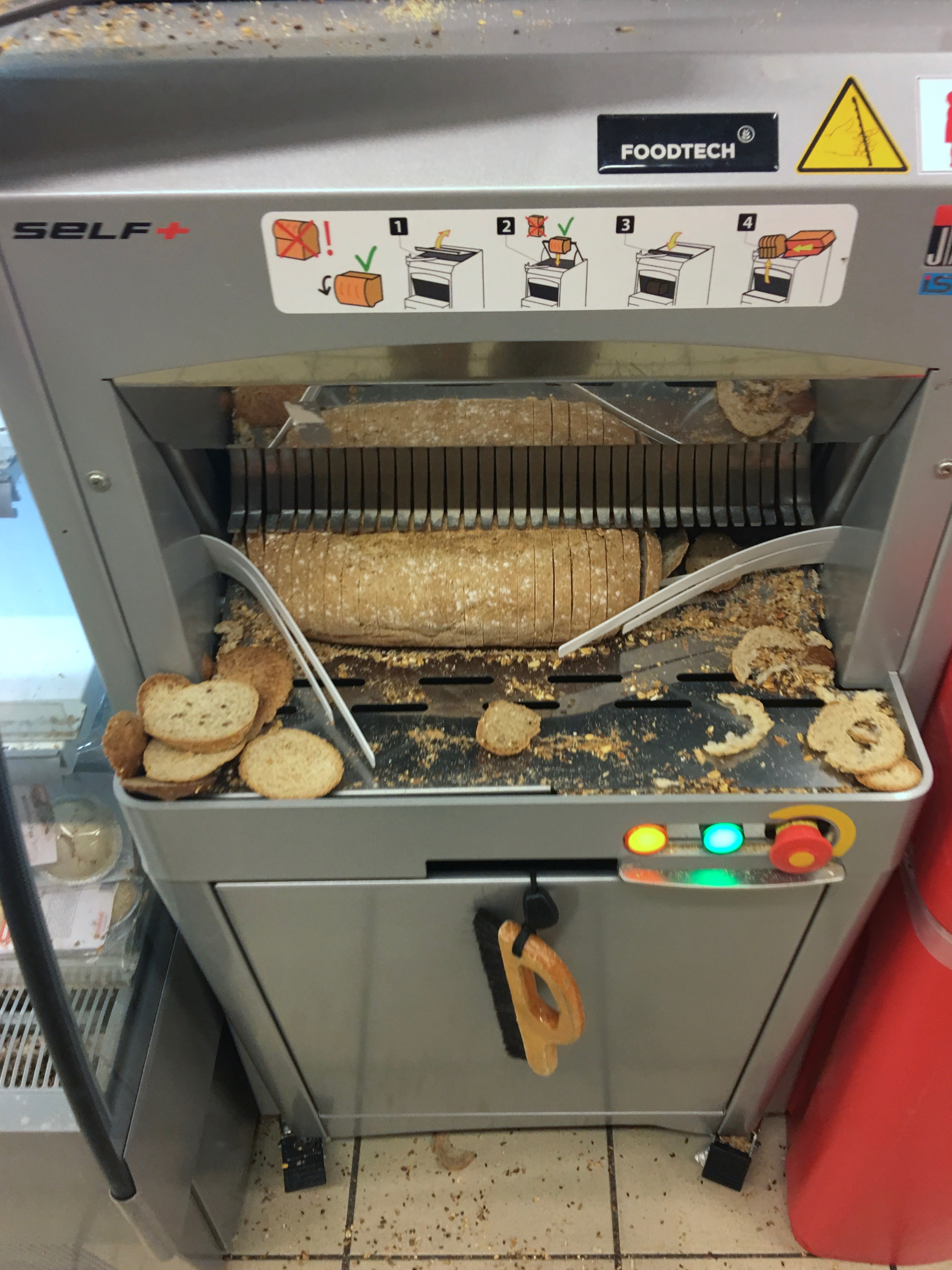
Industrial bread cutting machine

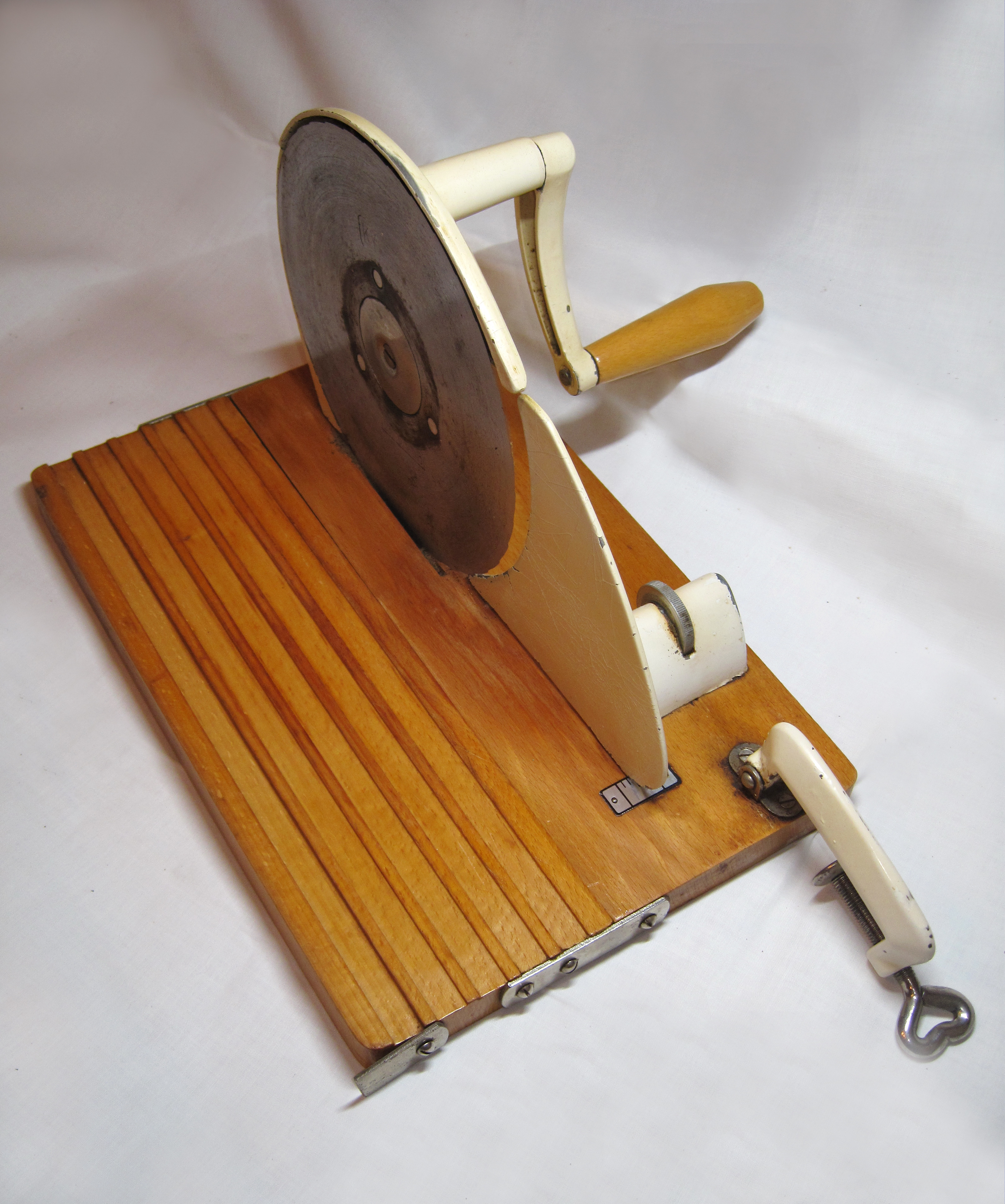
Mechanic bread cutting machine

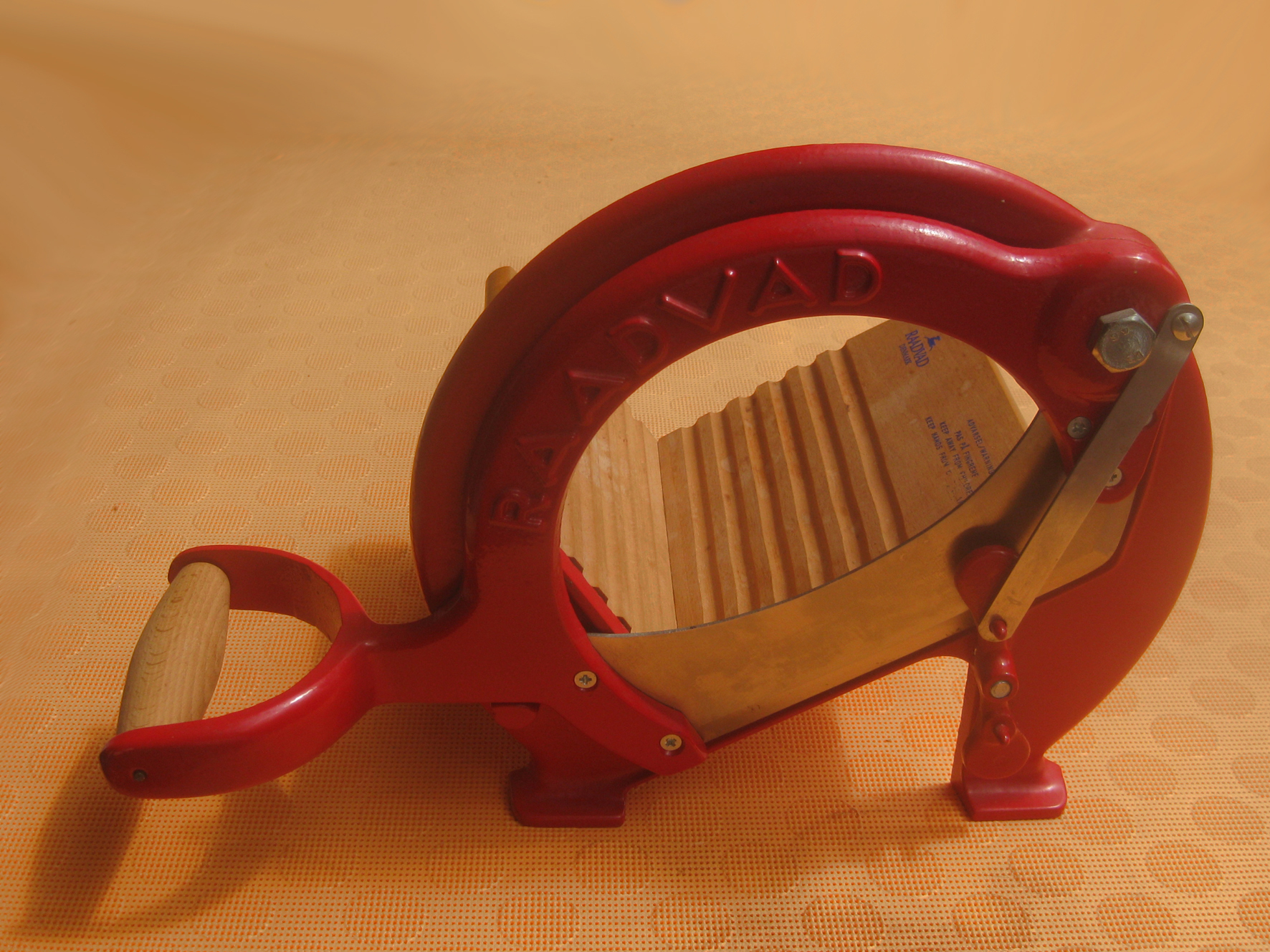
Mechanic bread cutting machine

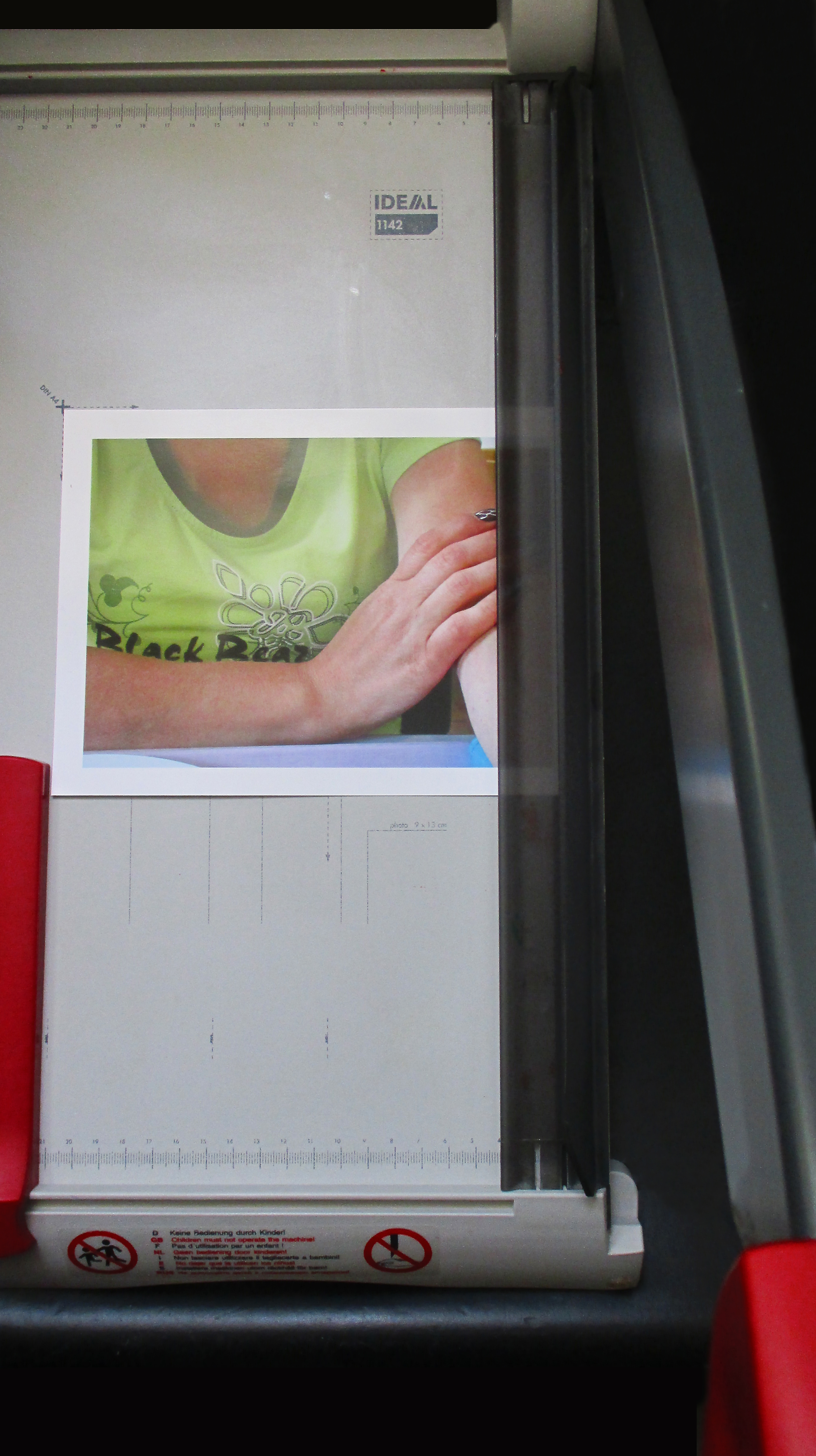
Photo slicer

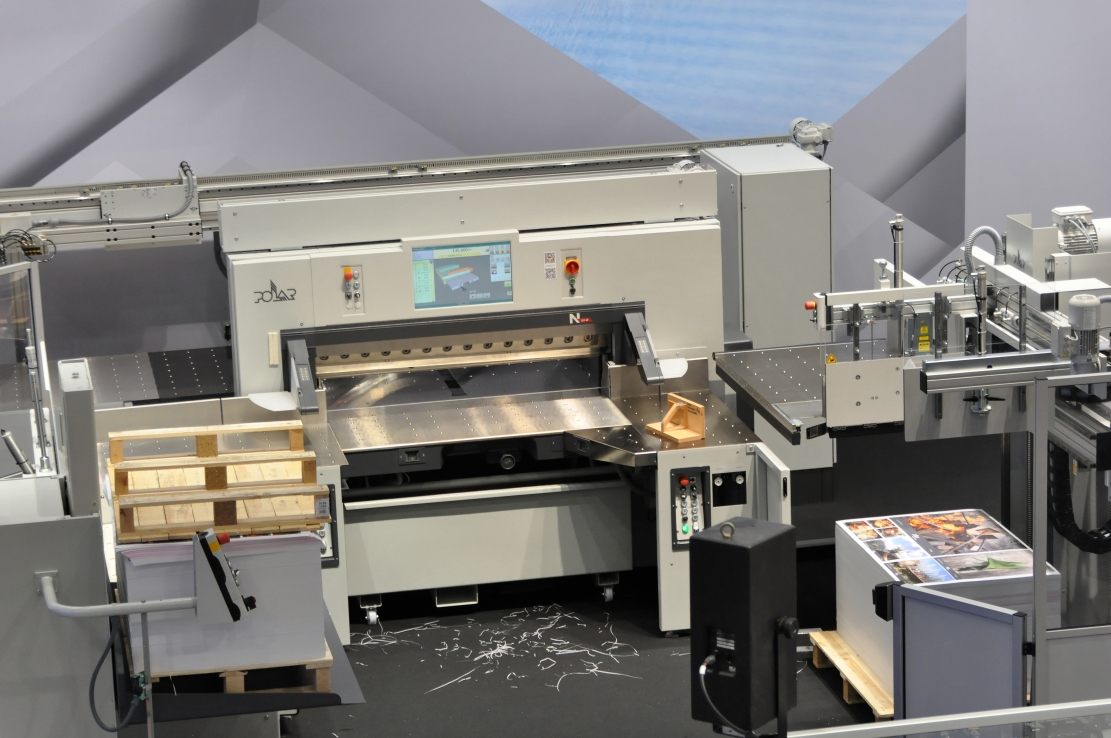
Industrial paper slicer

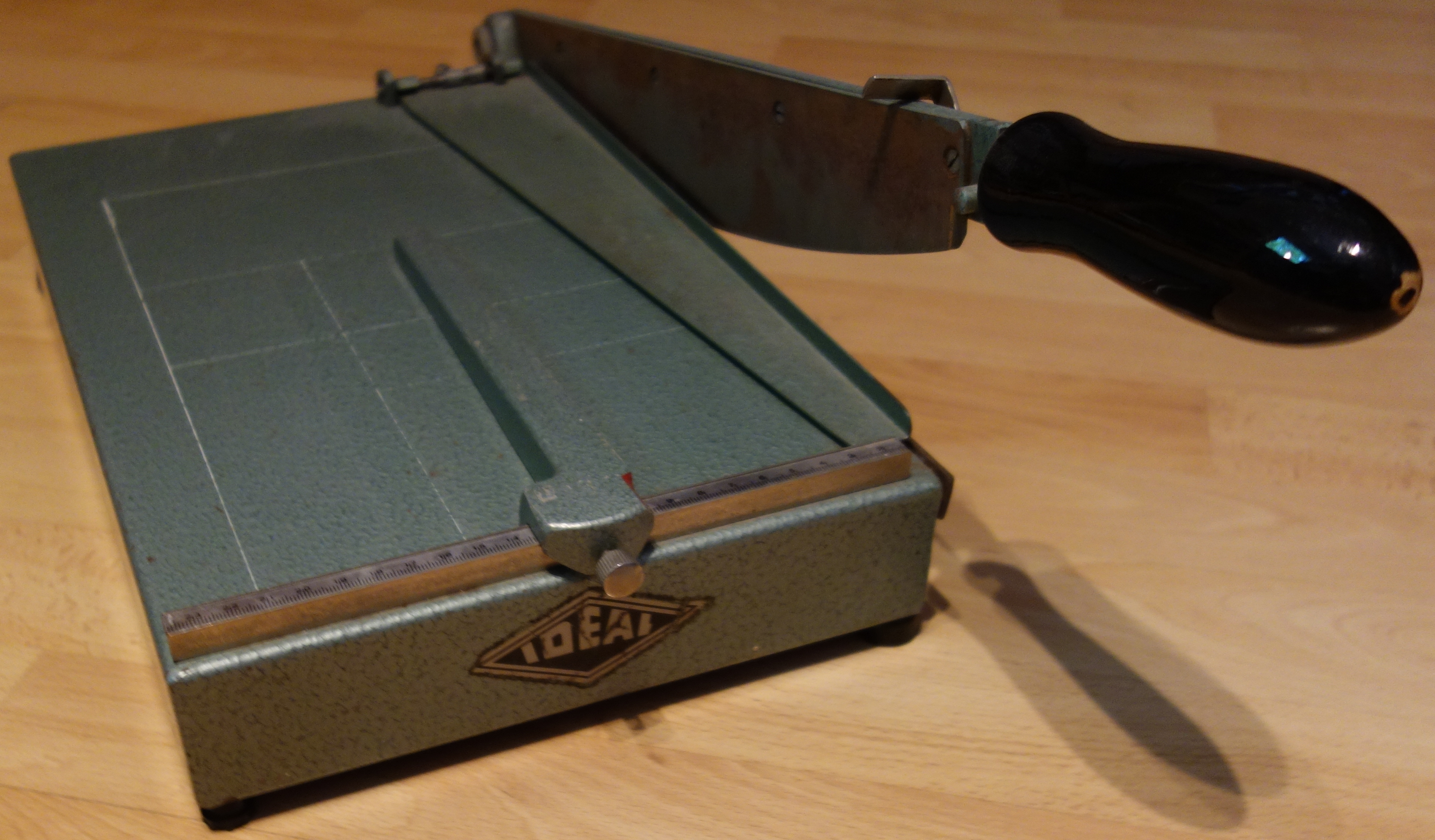
Paper slicer from the 1950s

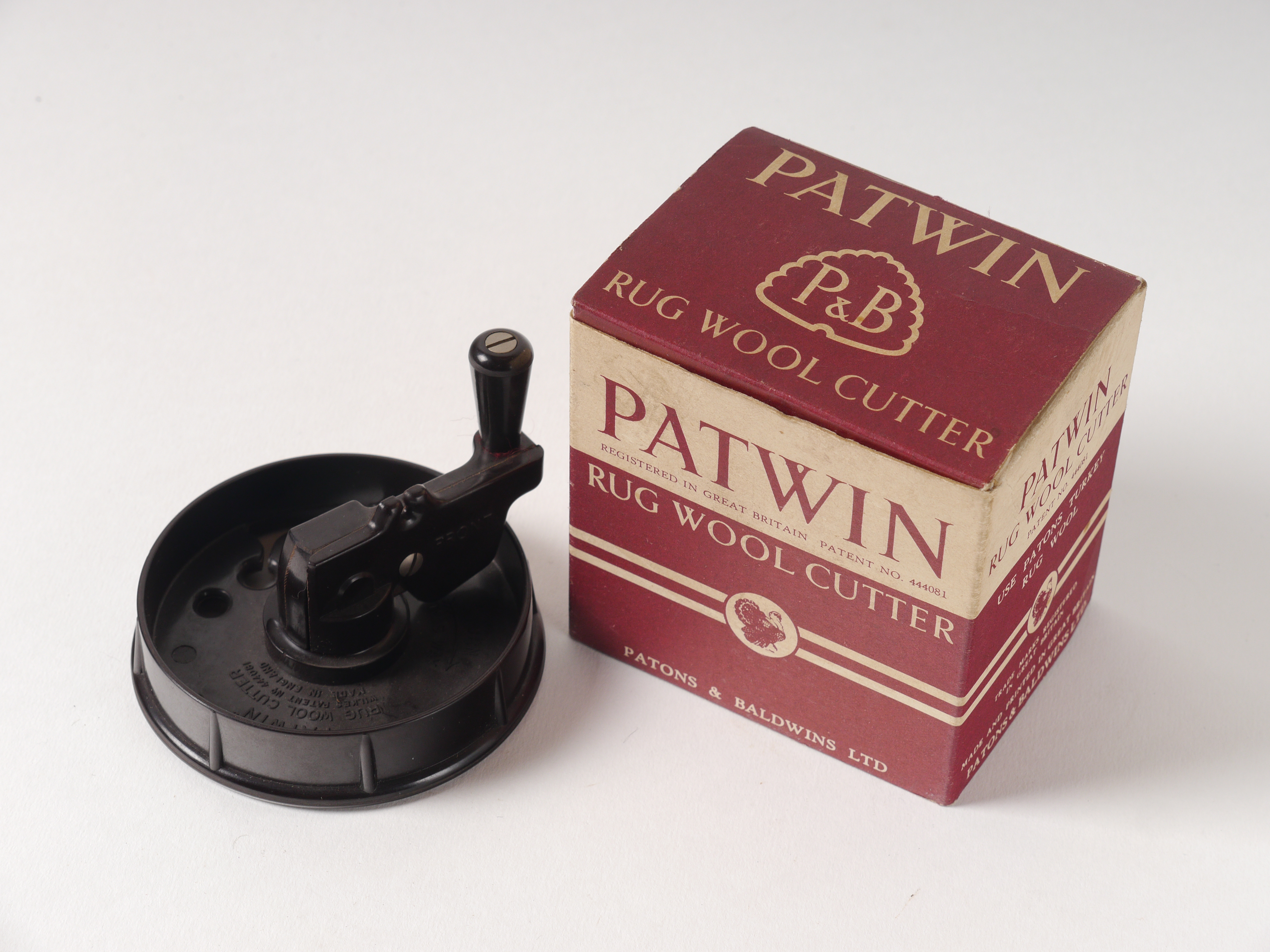
Patwin rug wool cutter (from the collection of The Museum of Industry in Ghent)
