= Lateral strain =

Measure of material deformation under longitudinal stress

In continuum mechanics, lateral strain, also known as transverse strain, is defined as the ratio of the change in diameter of a circular bar of a material to its diameter due to deformation in the longitudinal direction. It occurs when under the action of a longitudinal stress, a body will extend in the direction of the stress and contract in the transverse or lateral direction (in the case of tensile stress). When put under compression, the body will contract in the direction of the stress and extend in the transverse or lateral direction. It is a dimensionless quantity, as it is a ratio between two quantities of the same dimension.

== Poisson's Ratio ==
Poisson's Ratio defines the ratio between the negative lateral strain and the longitudinal strain, so lateral strain can be calculated using:

$$d\varepsilon_\text{trans}=-\nu \,d\varepsilon_\text{axial}$$.

== Exceptions ==
Some materials, known as auxetics, possess a negative Poisson's ratio because of their unique molecular structure. Because of this property, they experience a positive lateral strain alongside a positive longitudinal strain, and vice versa.

== See also ==
- Deformation (mechanics)
- Poisson's Ratio
