= John Dallesasse =

Electrical engineer

John M. Dallesasse
- Born: November 13, 1963 (age 62)
- Title: Holonyak Lab Professor of Electrical and Computer Engineering
- Awards: Fellow of the IEEE; Fellow of The Optical Society; Member of IEEE Electron Devices Society Board of Governors

Academic background
- Education: B.S., Electrical and Computer Engineering (1985); M.S., Electrical and Computer Engineering (1987); Ph.D., Electrical and Computer Engineering (1991)
- Alma mater: University of Illinois
- Doctoral advisor: Nick Holonyak

Academic work
- Institutions: University of Illinois

John Michael Dallesasse is a Professor of Electrical and Computer Engineering at the University of Illinois at Urbana–Champaign where his research is focused on silicon photonic integrated circuits (PICs), nanophotonics, semiconductor lasers / transistor lasers and photonics-electronics integration. He has over 60 publications and presentations, and holds 29 issued patents.

In 2010, Dallesasse co-founded Skorpios Technologies Inc., a silicon photonic integrated circuit company and foundry backed by Ericsson, Nokia Networks and venture-capital, where he was the Chief Technology Officer & Vice President. He is an advisor and consultant to numerous photonic companies and startups.

Dallesasse was named a Fellow of The Optical Society (OSA) in 2012 a Fellow of the Institute of Electrical and Electronics Engineers (IEEE) in 2015 and was elected into the IEEE Electron Devices Society Board of Governors in 2020.

== Education ==
Dallesasse received his B.S, M.S, and Ph.D in Electrical and Computer Engineering from University of Illinois in 1985, 1987 and 1991 respectively under the supervision of Nick Holonyak. In 1989, Dallesasse co-discovered the III-V semiconductor oxidation processing technology with Nick Holonyak for the formation of high-quality oxide layers for photonic device manufacturing. This is widely used in industry today and has made Vertical-cavity surface-emitting lasers practical for many applications, including optical data links in enterprise networks and data centers.

== Career ==
A specialist in the optoelectronics industry, Prof. Dallesasse has over 20 years of industry experience and has held a wide range of positions in technology development and management, including Vice President of MicroLink Devices, Senior Director of Engineering and Technology for EMCORE's Fiber Optics Division and CTO & VP of Skorpios Technologies.

At EMCORE, Dallesasse developed and commercialized the first 10 Gigabit Ethernet (10GBASE-LX4) optical transceiver.
