= Vertical-cavity surface-emitting laser =

Type of semiconductor laser diode

Diagram of a simple VCSEL structure

The vertical-cavity surface-emitting laser (VCSEL /ˈvɪksəl/) is a type of semiconductor laser diode with laser beam emission perpendicular from the top surface, contrary to conventional edge-emitting semiconductor lasers (also called in-plane lasers) which emit from surfaces formed by cleaving the individual chip out of a wafer. VCSELs are used in various laser products, including computer mice, fiber-optic communications, laser printers, Face ID, and smartglasses.

== Production advantages ==
There are several advantages to producing VCSELs, in contrast to the production process of edge-emitting lasers. Edge-emitters cannot be tested until the end of the production process. If the edge-emitter does not function properly, whether due to bad contacts or poor material growth quality, the production time and the processing materials have been wasted. VCSELs however, can be tested at several stages throughout the process to check for material quality and processing issues. For instance, if the vias, which are the electrical connections between layers of a circuit, have not been completely cleared of dielectric material during the etch, an interim testing process will flag that the top metal layer is not making contact to the initial metal layer. Additionally, because VCSELs emit the beam perpendicular to the active region of the laser as opposed to parallel as with an edge emitter, tens of thousands of VCSELs can be processed simultaneously on a three-inch gallium arsenide wafer. Thus, although the VCSEL production process is more labor and material intensive, the yield can be controlled to a more predictable and higher outcome.

== Structure ==
A realistic VCSEL device structure. This is a bottom-emitting multiple-quantum-well VCSEL.

The laser resonator consists of two distributed Bragg reflector (DBR) mirrors parallel to the wafer surface with an active region consisting of one or more quantum wells for the laser light generation in between. The planar DBR-mirrors consist of layers with alternating high and low refractive indices. Each layer has a thickness of a quarter of the laser wavelength in the material, yielding intensity reflectivities above 99%. High reflectivity mirrors are required in VCSELs to balance the short axial length of the gain region.

In common VCSELs the upper and lower mirrors are doped as p-type and n-type materials, forming a diode junction. In more complex structures, the p-type and n-type regions may be embedded between the mirrors, requiring a more complex semiconductor process to make electrical contact to the active region, but eliminating electrical power loss in the DBR structure.

In laboratory investigation of VCSELs using new material systems, the active region may be pumped by an external light source with a shorter wavelength, usually another laser. This allows a VCSEL to be demonstrated without the additional problem of achieving good electrical performance; however such devices are not practical for most applications.

VCSELs for wavelengths from 650 nm to 1300 nm are typically based on gallium arsenide (GaAs) wafers with DBRs formed from GaAs and aluminium gallium arsenide (Al_{x}Ga_{(1−x)}As). The GaAs–AlGaAs system is favored for constructing VCSELs because the lattice constant of the material does not vary strongly as the composition is changed, permitting multiple "lattice-matched" epitaxial layers to be grown on a GaAs substrate. However, the refractive index of AlGaAs does vary relatively strongly as the Al fraction is increased, minimizing the number of layers required to form an efficient Bragg mirror compared to other candidate material systems. Furthermore, at high aluminium concentrations, an oxide can be formed from AlGaAs, and this oxide can be used to restrict the current in a VCSEL, enabling very low threshold currents.

The main methods of restricting the current in a VCSEL are characterized by two types: ion-implanted VCSELs and oxide VCSELs.

In the early 1990s, telecommunications companies tended to favor ion-implanted VCSELs. Ions, (often hydrogen ions, H+), were implanted into the VCSEL structure everywhere except the aperture of the VCSEL, destroying the lattice structure around the aperture, thus inhibiting the current. In the mid to late 1990s, companies moved towards the technology of oxide VCSELs. The current is confined in an oxide VCSEL by oxidizing the material around the aperture of the VCSEL. A high content aluminium layer that is grown within the VCSEL structure is the layer that is oxidized. Oxide VCSELs also often employ the ion implant production step. As a result, in the oxide VCSEL, the current path is confined by the ion implant and the oxide aperture.

The initial acceptance of oxide VCSELs was plagued with concern about the apertures "popping off" due to the strain and defects of the oxidation layer. However, after much testing, the reliability of the structure has proven to be robust. As stated in one study by Hewlett Packard on oxide VCSELs, "The stress results show that the activation energy and the wearout lifetime of oxide VCSEL are similar to that of implant VCSEL emitting the same amount of output power." A production concern also plagued the industry when moving the oxide VCSELs from research and development to production mode. The oxidation rate of the oxide layer was highly dependent on the aluminium content. Any slight variation in aluminium would change the oxidation rate sometimes resulting in apertures that were either too big or too small to meet the specification standards.

Longer wavelength devices, from 1300 nm to 2000 nm, have been demonstrated with at least the active region made of indium phosphide. VCSELs at even higher wavelengths are experimental and usually optically pumped. 1310 nm VCSELs are desirable as the dispersion of silica-based optical fiber is minimal in this wavelength range.

=== Special forms ===
Multiple active region devices (aka bipolar cascade VCSELs)
Allows for differential quantum efficiency values in excess of 100% through carrier recycling
VCSELs with tunnel junctions
Using a tunnel junction (n^{+}p^{+}), an electrically advantageous n-n^{+}p^{+}-p-i-n configuration can be built that also may beneficially influence other structural elements (e.g. in the form of a Buried Tunnel Junction (BTJ)).
Tunable VCSELs with micromechanically movable mirrors (MEMS)
(either optically or electrically pumped)
Wafer-bonded or wafer-fused VCSEL
Combination of semiconductor materials that can be fabricated using different types of substrate wafers
Monolithically optically pumped VCSELs
Two VCSELs on top of each other. One of them optically pumps the other one.
VCSEL with longitudinally integrated monitor diode
A photodiode is integrated under the back mirror of the VCSEL. VCSEL with transversally integrated monitor diode: With suitable etching of the VCSEL's wafer, a resonant photodiode can be manufactured that may measure the light intensity of a neighboring VCSEL.
VCSELs with external cavities (VECSELs)
VECSELs are optically pumped with conventional laser diodes. This arrangement allows a larger area of the device to be pumped and therefore more power can be extracted – as much as 30 W. The external cavity also allows intracavity techniques such as frequency doubling, single frequency operation and femtosecond pulse modelocking.

Vertical-cavity semiconductor optical amplifiers
VCSOAs are optimized as amplifiers as opposed to oscillators. VCSOAs must be operated below threshold and thus require reduced mirror reflectivities for decreased feedback. In order to maximize the signal gain, these devices contain a large number of quantum wells (optically pumped devices have been demonstrated with 21–28 wells) and as a result exhibit single-pass gain values which are significantly larger than that of a typical VCSEL (roughly 5%). These structures operate as narrow linewidth (tens of GHz) amplifiers and may be implemented as amplifying filters.

== Characteristics ==
Because VCSELs emit from the top surface of the chip, they can be tested on-wafer, before they are cleaved into individual devices. This reduces the fabrication cost of the devices. It also allows VCSELs to be built not only in one-dimensional, but also in two-dimensional arrays.

The larger output aperture of VCSELs, compared to most edge-emitting lasers, produces a lower divergence angle of the output beam, and makes possible high coupling efficiency with optical fibers.

The small active region, compared to edge-emitting lasers, reduces the threshold current of VCSELs, resulting in low power consumption. However, as yet, VCSELs have lower emission power compared to edge-emitting lasers. The low threshold current also permits high intrinsic modulation bandwidths in VCSELs.

The wavelength of VCSELs may be tuned, within the gain band of the active region, by adjusting the thickness of the reflector layers.

While early VCSELs emitted in multiple longitudinal modes or in filament modes, single-mode VCSELs are now common.

=== High-power VCSELs ===
High-power vertical-cavity surface-emitting lasers can also be fabricated, either by increasing the emitting aperture size of a single device or by combining several elements into large two-dimensional (2D) arrays. There have been relatively few reported studies on high-power VCSELs. Large-aperture single devices operating around 100 mW were first reported in 1993. Improvements in the epitaxial growth, processing, device design, and packaging led to individual large-aperture VCSELs emitting several hundreds of milliwatts by 1998. More than 2 W continuous-wave (CW) operation at -10 degrees Celsius heat-sink temperature was also reported in 1998 from a VCSEL array consisting of 1,000 elements, corresponding to a power density of 30 W/cm^{2}. In 2001, more than 1 W CW power and 10 W pulsed power at room temperature were reported from a 19-element array. The VCSEL array chip was mounted on a diamond heat spreader, taking advantage of diamond’s very high thermal conductivity. A record 3 W CW output power was reported in 2005 from large diameter single devices emitting around 980 nm.

In 2007, more than 200 W of CW output power was reported from a large (5 × 5mm) 2D VCSEL array emitting around the 976 nm wavelength, representing a substantial breakthrough in the field of high-power VCSELs. The high power level achieved was mostly due to improvements in wall-plug efficiency and packaging. In 2009, >100 W power levels were reported for VCSEL arrays emitting around 808 nm.

At that point, the VCSEL technology became useful for a variety of medical, industrial, and military applications requiring high power or high energy. Examples of such applications are:

- Medical/cosmetics: laser hair removal, laser wrinkle removal
- Infrared illuminators for military/surveillance
- Pumping of solid-state lasers and fiber lasers
- High-power/high-energy second harmonic generation (blue/green light)
- Laser machining: laser cutting, laser drilling, laser ablation, laser engraving

== Applications ==
- Optical fiber data transmission
- Analog broadband signal transmission
- Absorption spectroscopy (TDLAS)
- Laser printers
- Computer mouse
- Biological tissue analysis
- Chip scale atomic clock
- Lidar for cellphone cameras
- Structured light (e.g. the "dot projector" for iPhone Face ID)
- Lidar for automobile collision avoidance

== History ==
The surface emission from a bulk semiconductor at ultra-low temperature and magnetic carrier confinement was reported by Ivars Melngailis in 1965. The first proposal of short cavity VCSEL was done by Kenichi Iga of Tokyo Institute of Technology in 1977. A simple drawing of his idea is shown in his research note. Contrary to the conventional Fabry-Perot edge-emitting semiconductor lasers, his invention comprises a short laser cavity less than 1/10 of the edge-emitting lasers vertical to a wafer surface. In 1979, a first demonstration on a short cavity VCSEL was done by Soda, Iga, Kitahara and Suematsu, but devices for CW operation at room temperature were not reported until 1988. The term VCSEL was coined in a publication of the Optical Society of America in 1987. In 1989, Jack Jewell led a Bell Labs / Bellcore collaboration (including Axel Scherer, Sam McCall, Yong Hee Lee and James Harbison) that demonstrated over 1 million VCSELs on a small chip. These first all-semiconductor VCSELs introduced other design features still used in all commercial VCSELs. "This demonstration marked a turning point in the development of the surface-emitting laser. Several more research groups entered the field, and many important innovations were soon being reported from all over the world". Andrew Yang of the Defense Advanced Research Projects Agency (DARPA) quickly initiated significant funding toward VCSEL R&D, followed by other government and industrial funding efforts. VCSELs replaced edge-emitting lasers in applications for short-range fiberoptic communication such as Gigabit Ethernet and Fibre Channel, and are now used for link bandwidths from 1 to 400 gigabits per second or greater.

== See also ==
- Interconnect bottleneck
- Optical cavity
- Optical communication
- Optical fiber cable
- Optical interconnect
- Optical microcavity
- Parallel optical interface
