= Optical transistor =

Device that switches or amplifies optical signals

An optical transistor, also known as photonic transistor, optical switch or light valve, is a device that switches or amplifies optical signals. Light occurring on an optical transistor's input changes the intensity of light emitted from the transistor's output while output power is supplied by an additional optical source. Since the input signal intensity may be weaker than that of the source, an optical transistor amplifies the optical signal. The device is the optical analog of the electronic transistor that forms the basis of modern electronic devices. Optical transistors provide a means to control light using only light and has applications in optical computing and fiber-optic communication networks. Such technology has the potential to exceed the speed of electronics, while conserving more power.

The fastest demonstrated all-optical switching signal is 900 attoseconds, which paves the way to develop ultrafast optical transistors.

Since photons inherently do not interact with each other, an optical transistor must employ an operating medium to mediate interactions. This is done without converting optical to electronic signals as an intermediate step. Implementations using a variety of operating mediums have been proposed and experimentally demonstrated. However, their ability to compete with modern electronics is currently limited.

== Applications ==
Optical transistors could be used to improve the performance of fiber-optic communication networks. Although fiber-optic cables are used to transfer data, tasks such as signal routing are done electronically. This requires optical-electronic-optical conversion, which form bottlenecks. In principle, all-optical digital signal processing and routing is achievable using optical transistors arranged into photonic integrated circuits. The same devices could be used to create new types of optical amplifiers to compensate for signal attenuation along transmission lines.

A more elaborate application of optical transistors is the development of an optical digital computer in which signals are photonic (i.e., light-transmitting media) rather than electronic (wires). Further, optical transistors that operate using single photons could form an integral part of quantum information processing where they can be used to selectively address individual units of quantum information, known as qubits.

Optical transistors could in theory be impervious to the high radiation of space and extraterrestrial planets, unlike electronic transistors which suffer from Single-event upset.

== Comparison with electronics ==
The most commonly argued case for optical logic is that optical transistor switching times can be much faster than in conventional electronic transistors. This is due to the fact that the speed of light in an optical medium is typically much faster than the drift velocity of electrons in semiconductors.

Optical transistors can be directly linked to fiber-optic cables whereas electronics requires coupling via photodetectors and LEDs or lasers. The more natural integration of all-optical signal processors with fiber-optics would reduce the complexity and delay in the routing and other processing of signals in optical communication networks.

It remains questionable whether optical processing can reduce the energy required to switch a single transistor to be less than that for electronic transistors. To realistically compete, transistors require a few tens of photons per operation. It is clear, however, that this is achievable in proposed single-photon transistors for quantum information processing.

Perhaps the most significant advantage of optical over electronic logic is reduced power consumption. This comes from the absence of capacitance in the connections between individual logic gates. In electronics, the transmission line needs to be charged to the signal voltage. The capacitance of a transmission line is proportional to its length and it exceeds the capacitance of the transistors in a logic gate when its length is equal to that of a single gate. The charging of transmission lines is one of the main energy losses in electronic logic. This loss is avoided in optical communication where only enough energy to switch an optical transistor at the receiving end must be transmitted down a line. This fact has played a major role in the uptake of fiber optics for long-distance communication but is yet to be exploited at the microprocessor level.

Besides the potential advantages of higher speed, lower power consumption and high compatibility with optical communication systems, optical transistors must satisfy a set of benchmarks before they can compete with electronics. No single design has yet satisfied all these criteria whilst outperforming speed and power consumption of state of the art electronics.

The criteria include:

- Fan-out - Transistor output must be in the correct form and of sufficient power to operate the inputs of at least two transistors. This implies that the input and output wavelengths, beam shapes and pulse shapes must be compatible.
- Logic level restoration - The signal needs to be 'cleaned' by each transistor. Noise and degradations in signal quality must be removed so that they do not propagate through the system and accumulate to produce errors.
- Logic level independent of loss - In optical communication, the signal intensity decreases over distance due to absorption of light in the fiber optic cable. Therefore, a simple intensity threshold cannot distinguish between on and off signals for arbitrary length interconnects. The system must encode zeros and ones at different frequencies, use differential signaling where the ratio or difference in two different powers carries the logic signal to avoid errors.

== Implementations ==
Several schemes have been proposed to implement all-optical transistors. In many cases, a proof of concept has been experimentally demonstrated. Among the designs are those based on:

- electromagnetically induced transparency
  - in an optical cavity or microresonator, where the transmission is controlled by a weaker flux of gate photons
  - in free space, i.e., without a resonator, by addressing strongly interacting Rydberg states
- a system of indirect excitons (composed of bound pairs of electrons and holes in double quantum wells with a static dipole moment). Indirect excitons, which are created by light and decay to emit light, strongly interact due to their dipole alignment.
- a system of microcavity polaritons (exciton-polaritons inside an optical microcavity) where, similar to exciton-based optical transistors, polaritons facilitate effective interactions between photons
- photonic crystal cavities with an active Raman gain medium
- cavity switch modulates cavity properties in time domain for quantum information applications.
- nanowire-based cavities employing polaritonic interactions for optical switching
- silicon microrings placed in the path of an optical signal. Gate photons heat the silicon microring causing a shift in the optical resonant frequency, leading to a change in transparency at a given frequency of the optical supply.
- a dual-mirror optical cavity that holds around 20,000 cesium atoms trapped by means of optical tweezers and laser-cooled to a few microkelvin. The cesium ensemble did not interact with light and was thus transparent. The length of a round trip between the cavity mirrors equaled an integer multiple of the wavelength of the incident light source, allowing the cavity to transmit the source light. Photons from the gate light field entered the cavity from the side, where each photon interacted with an additional "control" light field, changing a single atom's state to be resonant with the cavity optical field, which changing the field's resonance wavelength and blocking transmission of the source field, thereby "switching" the "device". While the changed atom remains unidentified, quantum interference allows the gate photon to be retrieved from the cesium. A single gate photon could redirect a source field containing up to two photons before the retrieval of the gate photon was impeded, above the critical threshold for a positive gain.
- in a concentrated water solution containing iodide anions
- Modification of the dielectric material reflectivity to demonstrate attosecond "petahertz" optical switching.
- Demonstration the Petahertz Optical Transistor (POT) by light-induced quantum current generation in graphene transistor

== See also ==
- Optical network on chip
- Optical interconnect
- Optical switch
- Parallel optical interface
- Optical communication
- Optical fiber cable
- Photonics
- Optoelectronics
- Electronics
- Transistor
- Optical physics
- Light
- Photons
- Optics
- Lasers
- Diodes
- Semiconductors
- Electrical elements
- Electronic components
