= Optoelectronics =

Branch of electronics involving optics

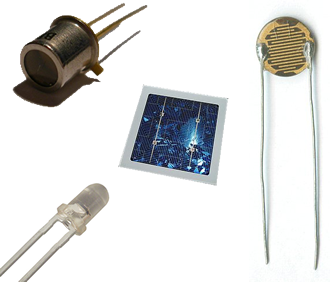
Electronic light sensors

Optoelectronics (or optronics) is the study and application of electronic devices and systems that find, detect and control light, usually considered a sub-field of photonics. In this context, light often includes invisible forms of radiation such as gamma rays, X-rays, ultraviolet and infrared, in addition to visible light. Optoelectronic devices are electrical-to-optical or optical-to-electrical transducers, or instruments that use such devices in their operation.

Electro-optics is often erroneously used as a synonym, but is a wider branch of physics that concerns all interactions between light and electric fields, regardless of whether they form part of an electronic device.

Optoelectronics is based on the quantum mechanical effects of light on electronic materials, especially semiconductors, sometimes in the presence of electric fields.

- Photoelectric or photovoltaic effect, used in:
  - photodiodes (including solar cells)
  - phototransistors
  - photomultipliers
  - optoisolators
  - integrated optical circuit (IOC) elements
- Photoconductivity, used in:
  - photoresistors
  - photoconductive camera tubes
  - charge-coupled imaging devices
- Stimulated emission, used in:
  - injection laser diodes
  - quantum cascade lasers
- Lossev effect, or radiative recombination, used in:
  - light-emitting diodes or LED
  - OLEDs
- Photoemissivity, used in
  - photoemissive camera tube

Important applications of optoelectronics include:

- Optocoupler
- Optical-fiber communications

== See also ==
- Electronics
- Interconnect bottleneck
- Liquid-crystal display
- Non-radiative lifetime
- OECC (OptoElectronics and Communications Conference)
- Optical amplifier
- Optical communication
- Optical fiber
- Optical interconnect
- Opto-electronic oscillator
- Parallel optical interface
- Photoemission
- Photoemission spectroscopy
- Photovoltaic effect
- Stimulated emission
