= PIN diode =

Optical diode invented by Jun-Ichi Nishizawa

- Layers of a PIN diode
- Component type: Semiconductor
- Inventor: Jun-Ichi Nishizawa
- Invention year: 1950

Electronic symbol
- The diode may be denoted by "PIN" letters on the diagram

A PIN diode is a diode with a wide, undoped intrinsic semiconductor region between a p-type semiconductor and an n-type semiconductor region. The p-type and n-type regions are typically heavily doped because they are used for ohmic contacts.

The wide intrinsic region is in contrast to an ordinary p–n diode. The wide intrinsic region makes the PIN diode an inferior rectifier (one typical function of a diode), but it makes it suitable for attenuators, fast switches, photodetectors, and high-voltage power electronics applications.

The PIN photodiode was invented by Jun-Ichi Nishizawa and his colleagues in 1950. It is a semiconductor device.

== Operation ==
A PIN diode operates under what is known as high-level injection. In other words, the intrinsic "i" region is flooded with charge carriers from the "p" and "n" regions. Its function can be likened to filling up a water bucket with a hole on the side. Once the water reaches the hole's level it will begin to pour out. Similarly, the diode will conduct current once the flooded electrons and holes reach an equilibrium point, where the number of electrons is equal to the number of holes in the intrinsic region.

When the diode is forward biased, the injected carrier concentration is typically several orders of magnitude higher than the intrinsic carrier concentration. Due to this high level injection, which in turn is due to the depletion process, the electric field extends deeply (almost the entire length) into the region. This electric field helps in speeding up of the transport of charge carriers from the P to the N region, which results in faster operation of the diode, making it a suitable device for high-frequency operation.

== Characteristics ==
The PIN diode obeys the standard diode equation for low-frequency signals. At higher frequencies, the diode looks like an almost perfect (very linear, even for large signals) resistor. The P-I-N diode has a relatively large stored charge adrift in a thick intrinsic region. At a low-enough frequency, the stored charge can be fully swept and the diode turns off. At higher frequencies, there is not enough time to sweep the charge from the drift region, so the diode never turns off. The time required to sweep the stored charge from a diode junction is its reverse recovery time, and it is relatively long in a PIN diode. For a given semiconductor material, on-state impedance, and minimum usable RF frequency, the reverse recovery time is fixed. This property can be exploited; one variety of P-I-N diode, the step recovery diode, exploits the abrupt impedance change at the end of the reverse recovery to create a narrow impulse waveform useful for frequency multiplication with high multiples.

The high-frequency resistance is inversely proportional to the DC bias current through the diode. A PIN diode, suitably biased, therefore acts as a variable resistor. This high-frequency resistance may vary over a wide range (from 0.1 Ω to 10 kΩ in some cases; the useful range is smaller, though).

The wide intrinsic region also means the diode will have a low capacitance when reverse-biased.

In a PIN diode the depletion region exists almost completely within the intrinsic region. This depletion region is much larger than in a PN diode and almost constant-size, independent of the reverse bias applied to the diode. This increases the volume where electron-hole pairs can be generated by an incident photon. Some photodetector devices, such as PIN photodiodes and phototransistors (in which the base-collector junction is a PIN diode), use a PIN junction in their construction.

The diode design has some design trade-offs. Increasing the cross-section area of the intrinsic region increases its stored charge reducing its RF on-state resistance while also increasing reverse bias capacitance and increasing the drive current required to remove the charge during a fixed switching time, with no effect on the minimum time required to sweep the charge from the I region. Increasing the thickness of the intrinsic region increases the total stored charge, decreases the minimum RF frequency, and decreases the reverse-bias capacitance, but doesn't decrease the forward-bias RF resistance and increases the minimum time required to sweep the drift charge and transition from low to high RF resistance. Diodes are sold commercially in a variety of geometries for specific RF bands and uses.

== Applications ==
PIN diodes are useful as RF switches, attenuators, photodetectors, and phase shifters.

=== RF and microwave switches ===
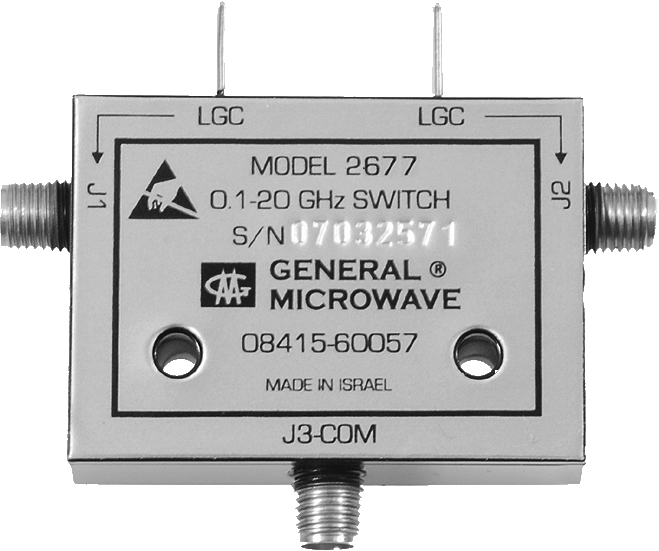
A PIN diode RF microwave switch

Under zero- or reverse-bias (the "off" state), a PIN diode has a low capacitance. The low capacitance will not pass much of an RF signal. Under a forward bias of 1 mA (the "on" state), a typical PIN diode will have an RF resistance of about 1 ohm, making it a good conductor of RF. Consequently, the PIN diode makes a good RF switch.

Although RF relays can be used as switches, they switch relatively slowly (on the order of tens of milliseconds). A PIN diode switch can switch much more quickly (e.g., 1 microsecond), although at lower RF frequencies it isn't reasonable to expect switching times in the same order of magnitude as the RF period.

For example, the capacitance of an "off"-state discrete PIN diode might be 1 pF. At 320 MHz, the capacitive reactance of 1 pF is 497 ohms:

$$\begin{align}
Z_\mathrm{diode} &= \frac{1}{2\pi fC}\\
&= \frac{1}{2\pi(320\times10^6\,\mathrm{Hz})(1\times10^{-12}\,\mathrm{F})}\\
&= 497\,\Omega
\end{align}$$

As a series element in a 50 ohm system, the off-state attenuation is:

$$\begin{align}
A &= 20\log_{10}\left(\frac{Z_\mathrm{load} + Z_\mathrm{source}} {Z_\mathrm{source} + Z_\mathrm{diode} + Z_\mathrm{load}}\right)\\
&= 20\log_{10}\left(\frac{50\,\Omega + 50\,\Omega} {50\,\Omega + 497\,\Omega + 50\,\Omega}\right)\\
&= {15.52}\,\mathrm{dB}
\end{align}$$

This attenuation may not be adequate. In applications where higher isolation is needed, both shunt and series elements may be used, with the shunt diodes biased in complementary fashion to the series elements. Adding shunt elements effectively reduces the source and load impedances, reducing the impedance ratio and increasing the off-state attenuation. However, in addition to the added complexity, the on-state attenuation is increased due to the series resistance of the on-state blocking element and the capacitance of the off-state shunt elements.

PIN diode switches are used not only for signal selection, but also component selection. For example, some low-phase-noise oscillators use them to range-switch inductors.

=== RF and microwave variable attenuators ===
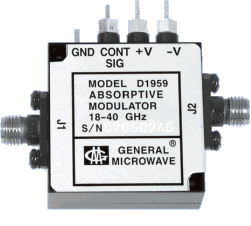
An RF microwave PIN diode attenuator

By changing the bias current through a PIN diode, it is possible to quickly change its RF resistance.

At high frequencies, the PIN diode appears as a resistor whose resistance is an inverse function of its forward current. Consequently, PIN diode can be used in some variable attenuator designs as amplitude modulators or output leveling circuits.

PIN diodes might be used, for example, as the bridge and shunt resistors in a bridged-T attenuator. Another common approach is to use PIN diodes as terminations connected to the 0 degree and -90 degree ports of a quadrature hybrid. The signal to be attenuated is applied to the input port, and the attenuated result is taken from the isolation port. The advantages of this approach over the bridged-T and pi approaches are (1) complementary PIN diode bias drives are not needed—the same bias is applied to both diodes—and (2) the loss in the attenuator equals the return loss of the terminations, which can be varied over a very wide range.

=== Limiters ===
PIN diodes are sometimes designed for use as input protection devices for high-frequency test probes and other circuits. If the input signal is small, the PIN diode has negligible impact, presenting only a small parasitic capacitance. Unlike a rectifier diode, it does not present a nonlinear resistance at RF frequencies, which would give rise to harmonics and intermodulation products. If the signal is large, then when the PIN diode starts to rectify the signal, the forward current charges the drift region and the device RF impedance is inversely proportional to the signal amplitude. That signal amplitude varying resistance can be used to terminate some predetermined portion of the signal in a resistive network dissipating the energy or to create an impedance mismatch that reflects the incident signal back toward the source. The latter may be combined with an isolator, a device containing a circulator which uses a permanent magnetic field to break reciprocity and a resistive load to separate and terminate the backward traveling wave. When used as a shunt limiter the PIN diode impedance is low over the entire RF cycle, unlike paired rectifier diodes that would swing from a high resistance to a low resistance during each RF cycle clamping the waveform and not reflecting it as completely. The ionization recovery time of gas molecules that permits the creation of the higher power spark gap input protection device ultimately relies on similar physics in a gas.

=== Photodetector and photovoltaic cell ===
The PIN photodiode was invented by Jun-ichi Nishizawa and his colleagues in 1950.

PIN photodiodes are used in fibre optic network cards and switches. As a photodetector, the PIN diode has a reverse-bias. Under reverse bias, the diode ordinarily does not conduct (save a small dark current or I_{s} leakage). When a photon of sufficient energy enters the depletion region of the diode, it creates an electron-hole pair. The reverse-bias field sweeps the carriers out of the region, creating current. Some detectors can use avalanche multiplication.

The same mechanism applies to the PIN structure, or p-i-n junction, of a solar cell. In this case, the advantage of using a PIN structure over conventional semiconductor p–n junction is better long-wavelength response of the former. In case of long wavelength irradiation, photons penetrate deep into the cell. But only those electron-hole pairs generated in and near the depletion region contribute to current generation. The depletion region of a PIN structure extends across the intrinsic region, deep into the device. This wider depletion width enables electron-hole pair generation deep within the device, which increases the quantum efficiency of the cell.

Commercially available PIN photodiodes have quantum efficiencies above 80-90% in the telecom wavelength range (~1500 nm), and are typically made of germanium or InGaAs. They feature fast response times (higher than their p-n counterparts), running into several tens of gigahertz, making them ideal for high speed optical telecommunication applications. Similarly, silicon p-i-n photodiodes have even higher quantum efficiencies, but can only detect wavelengths above the bandgap of silicon, i.e. ~1100 nm.

Typically, amorphous silicon thin-film cells use PIN structures. On the other hand, CdTe cells use NIP structure, a variation of the PIN structure. In a NIP structure, an intrinsic CdTe layer is sandwiched by n-doped CdS and p-doped ZnTe; the photons are incident on the n-doped layer, unlike in a PIN diode.

A PIN photodiode can also be used as a semiconductor detector to sense ionizing radiation.

In modern fiber-optical communications, the speed of optical transmitters and receivers is one of the most important parameters. Due to the small surface of the photodiode, its parasitic (unwanted) capacitance is reduced. The bandwidth of modern pin photodiodes is reaching the microwave and millimeter waves range.

== Example PIN photodiodes ==
SFH203 and BPW34 are cheap general purpose PIN diodes in 5 mm clear plastic cases with bandwidths over 100 MHz.

== See also ==
- Fiber-optic cable
- Interconnect bottleneck
- Optical communication
- Optical interconnect
- Parallel optical interface
- Step recovery diode
