= Lih Y. Lin =

American electrical engineer

Lih-Yuan Lin is an American electrical engineer whose research concerns photonics and nanotechnology. She is a professor in the University of Washington Department of Electrical & Computer Engineering.

== Research ==
Lin is particularly known for her development of micro-electromechanical optical switches. She has also explored the use of quantum dots as optical waveguides, and the applications of metal halide perovskites in integrated photonics. She has developed efficient solar cells based on quantum dots and optical tweezers for biological sampling, and contributed to optogenetics, the light-based control of biological cells, using quantum dots as a light source.

== Education and career ==
Lin earned a Ph.D. in electrical engineering from the University of California, Los Angeles in 1996.

She worked for AT&T Labs from 1996 until 2000, when she became Director of Optical Technologies at Tellium, an optical communications company based in New Jersey. She took her present position as a faculty member at the University of Washington in 2003.

== Recognition ==
In 2010, Lin was named as an IEEE Fellow, "for contributions to optical micro-electro-mechanical systems switching technologies". She was named as a 2020 Optica Fellow, "for significant contributions to the research and development of MEMS optical switching technologies, and innovation in solution-processed photonic components and devices". She became a member of the American Institute for Medical and Biological Engineering College of Fellows, in its 2024 class, "for contributions in applying nanophotonics to biological and biomedical engineering research and broader impacts through promoting diversity".
