= Transistor laser =

Transistor laser is a semiconductor device that functions as a transistor with an electrical output and an optical output, as opposed to the typical two electrical outputs. This optical output separates it from typical transistors and, because optical signals travel faster than electrical signals, has the potential to speed up computing immensely. Researchers who discovered the transistor laser developed a new model of Kirchhoff's current law to better model the behavior of simultaneous optical and electrical output.

== Discovery ==
The team credited with discovering the transistor laser was headed by Milton Feng and Nick Holonyak, Jr., and was based at the University of Illinois at Urbana-Champaign. Research into the transistor laser came about after Feng and Holonyak created the first light-emitting transistor in 2004. Feng and his team then modified the light-emitting transistor to focus the light its output into a laser beam. Their research was funded by DARPA. The paper written about the discovery of the transistor laser was ranked as a top five paper out of all of Applied Physics Letters’ history, and the transistor laser was called one of the top 100 discoveries by Discover.

== Construction of transistor ==
The transistor laser functions like a typical transistor, but emits infrared light through one of its outputs rather than electricity. A reflective cavity within the device focuses the emitted light into a laser beam. The transistor laser is a heterojunction bipolar transistor (using different materials between the base and emitter regions) that employs a quantum well in its base region that causes emissions of infrared light. While all transistors emit some small amount of light during operation, the use of a quantum well increases the intensity of light output by as much as 40 times.

The laser output of the device works when the quantum well in the base region captures electrons that would normally be sent out through the electrical output. These electrons then undergo a process of radiative recombination, during which electrons and positively charged "holes" recombine in the base. While this process occurs in all transistors, it has an exceedingly short lifespan of only 30 picoseconds in the transistor laser, allowing for faster operation. Photons are then released through stimulated emission. Light bounces back and forth between reflective walls inside the 2.2 micrometer wide emitter, that acts as a resonant cavity. Finally, light is emitted as a laser.

The device was initially constructed out of layers of indium gallium phosphide, gallium arsenide, and indium gallium arsenide, which prevented the device from running without being cooled with liquid nitrogen. Current materials allow for operation at 25 °C and continuous wave operation (continuously emitting light) at 3 GHz. The transistor laser can produce laser output without any resonance peak in the frequency response. It also does not suffer from unwanted self-resonance that results in errors in transmitted information that would necessitate complicated external circuitry to rectify.

== Potential to speed up computers ==
Even though the transistor laser is still only the subject of research, there has been a significant amount of speculation as to what one could be used for, especially in computing. For instance, its optical capabilities could be used to transfer data between memory chips, graphics cards, or other internal computer elements at faster rates. Currently, optic-fiber communication requires transmitters that convert electrical signals to pulses of light, and then a converter on the other end to revert these pulses back to electrical signals. This makes optical communication within computers impractical. Optical communication within computers could soon be practical, though, because the conversion of electricity to optical signals and vice versa occurs within the transistor laser without the need for external circuitry. The device could also speed up current optical communication in other applications, such as in the communication of large amounts of data over long distances.

== Changing Kirchhoff's laws ==
The research team that discovered the transistor laser claimed that one of Kirchhoff’s laws would have to be reconstructed to include energy conservation, as opposed to just current and charge. Because the transistor laser provides two different kinds of output, the team of researchers responsible for the transistor laser had to modify Kirchhoff’s current law to apply to the balance of energy as well as the balance of charge. This marked the first time Kirchhoff’s laws had been extended to apply to not just electrons, but photons, too.
