= Silicon photonics =

Quantum optics in silicon

Silicon photonics is the study and application of photonic systems which use silicon as an optical medium. The silicon is usually patterned with sub-micrometre precision, into microphotonic components. These operate in the infrared, most commonly at the 1.55 micrometre wavelength used by most fiber optic telecommunication systems. The silicon typically lies on top of a layer of silica in what (by analogy with a similar construction in microelectronics) is known as silicon on insulator (SOI).

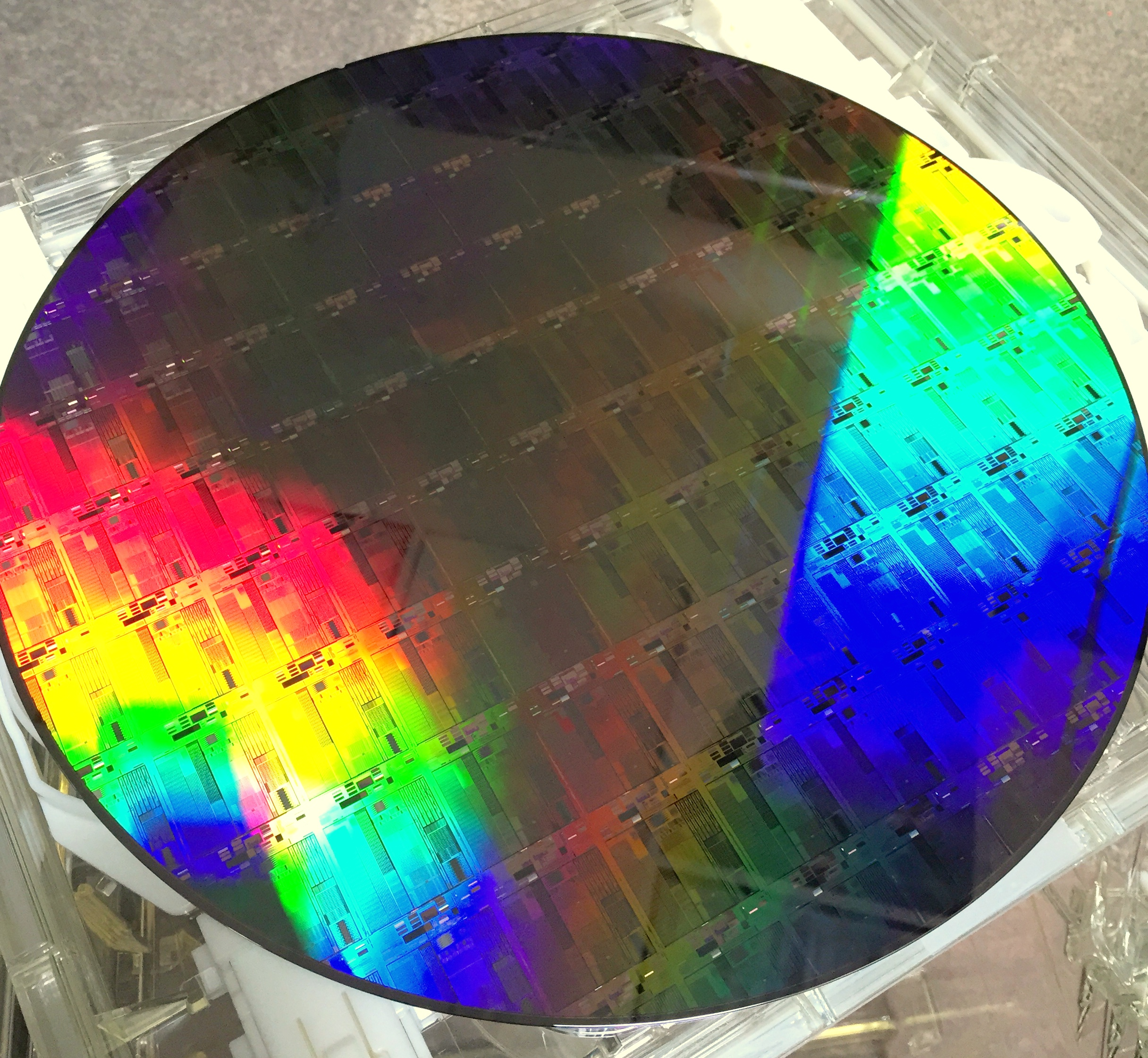
Silicon photonics 300 mm wafer

Silicon photonic devices can be made using existing semiconductor fabrication techniques, and because silicon is already used as the substrate for most integrated circuits, it is possible to create hybrid devices in which the optical and electronic components are integrated onto a single microchip. Consequently, silicon photonics is being actively researched by many electronics manufacturers including IBM and Intel, as well as by academic research groups, as a means for keeping on track with Moore's Law, by using optical interconnects to provide faster data transfer both between and within microchips.

The propagation of light through silicon devices is governed by a range of nonlinear optical phenomena including the Kerr effect, the Raman effect, two-photon absorption and interactions between photons and free charge carriers. The presence of nonlinearity is of fundamental importance, as it enables light to interact with light, thus permitting applications such as wavelength conversion and all-optical signal routing, in addition to the passive transmission of light.

Silicon waveguides are also of great academic interest, due to their unique guiding properties, they can be used for communications, interconnects, biosensors, and they offer the possibility to support exotic nonlinear optical phenomena such as soliton propagation.

== Applications ==
=== Optical communications ===
In a typical optical link, data is first transferred from the electrical to the optical domain using an electro-optic modulator or a directly modulated laser. An electro-optic modulator can vary the intensity and/or the phase of the optical carrier. In silicon photonics, a common technique to achieve modulation is to vary the density of free charge carriers. Variations of electron and hole densities change the real and the imaginary part of the refractive index of silicon as described by the empirical equations of Soref and Bennett. Modulators can consist of both forward-biased PIN diodes, which generally generate large phase-shifts but suffer of lower speeds, as well as of reverse-biased p–n junctions. A prototype optical interconnect with microring modulators integrated with germanium detectors has been demonstrated. Non-resonant modulators, such as Mach-Zehnder interferometers, have typical dimensions in the millimeter range and are usually used in telecom or datacom applications. Resonant devices, such as ring-resonators, can have dimensions of only tens of micrometers, therefore occupying much smaller areas. In 2013, researchers demonstrated a resonant depletion modulator that can be fabricated using standard Silicon-on-Insulator Complementary Metal-Oxide-Semiconductor (SOI CMOS) manufacturing processes. A similar device has been demonstrated as well in bulk CMOS rather than in SOI.

On the receiver side, the optical signal is typically converted back to the electrical domain using a semiconductor photodetector. The semiconductor used for carrier generation usually had a band-gap smaller than the photon energy, and the most common choice is pure germanium. Most detectors use a p–n junction for carrier extraction, however, detectors based on metal–semiconductor junctions (with germanium as the semiconductor) have been integrated into silicon waveguides as well. More recently, silicon-germanium avalanche photodiodes capable of operating at 40 Gbit/s have been fabricated. Complete transceivers have been commercialized in the form of active optical cables.

Optical communications are conveniently classified by the reach, or length, of their links. The majority of silicon photonic communications have so far been limited to telecom and datacom applications, where the reach is of several kilometers or several meters respectively.

Silicon photonics, however, is expected to play a significant role in computercom as well, where optical links have a reach in the centimeter to meter range. In fact, progress in computer technology (and the continuation of Moore's Law) is becoming increasingly dependent on faster data transfer between and within microchips. Optical interconnects may provide a way forward, and silicon photonics may prove particularly useful, once integrated on the standard silicon chips. In 2006, Intel Senior Vice President - and future CEO - Pat Gelsinger stated that, "Today, optics is a niche technology. Tomorrow, it's the mainstream of every chip that we build." In 2010 Intel demonstrated a 50 Gbit/s connection made with silicon photonics.

The first microprocessor with optical input/output (I/O) was demonstrated in December 2015 using an approach known as "zero-change" CMOS photonics. This is known as fiber-to-the-processor. This first demonstration was based on a 45 nm SOI node, and the bi-directional chip-to-chip link was operated at a rate of 2×2.5 Gbit/s. The total energy consumption of the link was calculated to be of 16 pJ/b and was dominated by the contribution of the off-chip laser.

Some researchers believe an on-chip laser source is required. Others think that it should remain off-chip because of thermal problems (the quantum efficiency decreases with temperature, and computer chips are generally hot) and because of CMOS-compatibility issues. One such device is the hybrid silicon laser, in which the silicon is bonded to a different semiconductor (such as indium phosphide) as the lasing medium. Other devices include all-silicon Raman laser or an all-silicon Brillouin lasers wherein silicon serves as the lasing medium.

In 2012, IBM announced that it had achieved optical components at the 90 nanometer scale that can be manufactured using standard techniques and incorporated into conventional chips. In September 2013, Intel announced technology to transmit data at speeds of 100 gigabits per second along a cable approximately five millimeters in diameter for connecting servers inside data centers. Conventional PCI-E data cables carry data at up to eight gigabits per second, while networking cables reach 40 Gbit/s. The latest version of the USB standard tops out at ten Gbit/s. The technology does not directly replace existing cables in that it requires a separate circuit board to interconvert electrical and optical signals. Its advanced speed offers the potential of reducing the number of cables that connect blades on a rack and even of separating processor, storage and memory into separate blades to allow more efficient cooling and dynamic configuration.

Graphene photodetectors have the potential to surpass germanium devices in several important aspects, although they remain about one order of magnitude behind current generation capacity, despite rapid improvement. Graphene devices can work at very high frequencies, and could in principle reach higher bandwidths. Graphene can absorb a broader range of wavelengths than germanium. That property could be exploited to transmit more data streams simultaneously in the same beam of light. Unlike germanium detectors, graphene photodetectors do not require applied voltage, which could reduce energy needs. Finally, graphene detectors in principle permit a simpler and less expensive on-chip integration. However, graphene does not strongly absorb light. Pairing a silicon waveguide with a graphene sheet better routes light and maximizes interaction. The first such device was demonstrated in 2011. Manufacturing such devices using conventional manufacturing techniques has not been demonstrated.

=== Optical routers and signal processors ===
Another application of silicon photonics is in signal routers for optical communication. Construction can be greatly simplified by fabricating the optical and electronic parts on the same chip, rather than having them spread across multiple components. A wider aim is all-optical signal processing, whereby tasks which are conventionally performed by manipulating signals in electronic form are done directly in optical form. An important example is all-optical switching, whereby the routing of optical signals is directly controlled by other optical signals. Another example is all-optical wavelength conversion.

In 2013, a startup company named "Compass-EOS", based in California and in Israel, was the first to present a commercial silicon-to-photonics router.

=== Long range telecommunications using silicon photonics ===
Silicon microphotonics can potentially increase the Internet's bandwidth capacity by providing micro-scale, ultra low power devices. Furthermore, the power consumption of datacenters may be significantly reduced if this is successfully achieved. Researchers at Sandia, Kotura, NTT, Fujitsu and various academic institutes have been attempting to prove this functionality. A 2010 paper reported on a prototype 80 km, 12.5 Gbit/s transmission using microring silicon devices.

=== Light-field displays ===
As of 2015, US startup company Magic Leap is working on a light-field chip using silicon photonics for the purpose of an augmented reality display.

=== Artificial intelligence ===
Silicon photonics has been used in artificial intelligence inference processors that are more energy efficient than those using conventional transistors. This can be done using Mach-Zehnder interferometers (MZIs) which can be combined with nanoelectromechanical systems to modulate the light passing through it, by physically bending the MZI which changes the phase of the light.

=== Multilayer integration architectures ===
Silicon photonic integrated circuits have been developed using a variety of integration architectures to improve device density, optical routing, and functional complexity. In addition to planar waveguide layouts, researchers have investigated three-dimensional integration techniques that employ vertically stacked photonic layers to overcome scaling limitations associated with conventional photonic integrated circuits. These approaches complement other integration strategies, including heterogeneous integration and advanced photonic packaging.

==== Monolithic multilayer photonic integration ====
Monolithic multilayer photonic integration (MPI) is a three-dimensional approach to silicon photonics in which optical components are fabricated in multiple vertically stacked layers rather than on a single planar waveguide layer.

The approach seeks to overcome routing congestion and waveguide crossings in planar photonic integrated circuits. More importantly, it offers efficient utilization of wafer area. The relatively large size of optical waveguides—hundreds of nanometers, compared to few-nanometer feature size of electronic components—poses an economic challenge. The real estate on the most advanced CMOS nodes are too expensive for relatively large footprint of photonic devices. Monolithic 3D integration may solve this problem as well as leading to more compact optical transceivers for dense interconnects in GPU clusters in AI datacenters.

One implementation of monolithic multilayer photonic integration is the Simox 3D Sculpting developed by Bahram Jalali and students at UCLA using structured multilayer SIMOX technology. This technology which has produced silicon photonics with up to 3 vertical coupled layers and vertical integration of transistors on top of buried photonic circuits allows very accurate control of the critical coupling dimensions. It is inherently compatible with silicon-on-insulator (SOI), the starting substrate for all silicon photonics.

More broadly, multilayer photonic integration has been investigated as part of a wider trend toward three-dimensional photonic integrated circuits capable of supporting higher levels of functional complexity than conventional planar devices. By distributing waveguides, resonators, couplers, and other photonic components across multiple layers, designers can reduce the number of waveguide crossings, shorten optical routing paths, and improve layout efficiency while maintaining compatibility with complementary metal–oxide–semiconductor (CMOS) fabrication processes. The use of vertically coupled waveguides and interlayer transitions has also enabled the integration of passive and active photonic functions within a single chip while minimizing insertion loss and optical crosstalk.

==== Heterogeneous photonic integration ====
Heterogeneous integration is another technique used in silicon photonics. Silicon can be used for passive integrated photonic applications using mature CMOS foundries, but its indirect bandgap prevents efficient light emission for lasers, and it lacks nonlinear properties such as the Pockels effect for efficient electro-optic (EO) modulation. Heterogeneous integration bypasses these limitations by bonding thin films of other materials to silicon. Example materials include III-V semiconductors with excellent optoelectronic attributes, lithium niobate and barium titanate for electro-optic applications, and yttrium iron garnet (YIG) for magneto-optical modulation and optical isolators. Methods used include micro-transfer printing, van der Waals integration, and wafer bonding.

== Physical properties ==
=== Optical guiding and dispersion tailoring ===
Silicon is transparent to infrared light with wavelengths above about 1.1 micrometres. Silicon also has a very high refractive index, of about 3.5. The tight optical confinement provided by this high index allows for microscopic optical waveguides, which may have cross-sectional dimensions of only a few hundred nanometers. Single mode propagation can be achieved, thus (like single-mode optical fiber) eliminating the problem of modal dispersion.

The strong dielectric boundary effects that result from this tight confinement substantially alter the optical dispersion relation. By selecting the waveguide geometry, it is possible to tailor the dispersion to have desired properties, which is of crucial importance to applications requiring ultrashort pulses. In particular, the group velocity dispersion (that is, the extent to which group velocity varies with wavelength) can be closely controlled. In bulk silicon at 1.55 micrometres, the group velocity dispersion (GVD) is normal in that pulses with longer wavelengths travel with higher group velocity than those with shorter wavelength. By selecting a suitable waveguide geometry, however, it is possible to reverse this, and achieve anomalous GVD, in which pulses with shorter wavelengths travel faster. Anomalous dispersion is significant, as it is a prerequisite for soliton propagation, and modulational instability.

In order for the silicon photonic components to remain optically independent from the bulk silicon of the wafer on which they are fabricated, it is necessary to have a layer of intervening material. This is usually silica, which has a much lower refractive index (of about 1.44 in the wavelength region of interest), and thus light at the silicon-silica interface will (like light at the silicon-air interface) undergo total internal reflection, and remain in the silicon. This construct is known as silicon on insulator. It is named after the technology of silicon on insulator in electronics, whereby components are built upon a layer of insulator in order to reduce parasitic capacitance and so improve performance. Silicon photonics have also been built with silicon nitride as the material in the optical waveguides.

=== Kerr nonlinearity ===
Silicon has a focusing Kerr nonlinearity, in that the refractive index increases with optical intensity. This effect is not especially strong in bulk silicon, but it can be greatly enhanced by using a silicon waveguide to concentrate light into a very small cross-sectional area. This allows nonlinear optical effects to be seen at low powers. The nonlinearity can be enhanced further by using a slot waveguide, in which the high refractive index of the silicon is used to confine light into a central region filled with a strongly nonlinear polymer.

Kerr nonlinearity underlies a wide variety of optical phenomena. One example is four wave mixing, which has been applied in silicon to realise optical parametric amplification, parametric wavelength conversion, and frequency comb generation.,

Kerr nonlinearity can also cause modulational instability, in which it reinforces deviations from an optical waveform, leading to the generation of spectral-sidebands and the eventual breakup of the waveform into a train of pulses. Another example (as described below) is soliton propagation.

=== Two-photon absorption ===
Silicon exhibits two-photon absorption (TPA), in which a pair of photons can act to excite an electron-hole pair. This process is related to the Kerr effect, and by analogy with complex refractive index, can be thought of as the imaginary-part of a complex Kerr nonlinearity. At the 1.55 micrometre telecommunication wavelength, this imaginary part is approximately 10% of the real part.

The influence of TPA is highly disruptive, as it both wastes light, and generates unwanted heat. It can be mitigated, however, either by switching to longer wavelengths (at which the TPA to Kerr ratio drops), or by using slot waveguides (in which the internal nonlinear material has a lower TPA to Kerr ratio). Alternatively, the energy lost through TPA can be partially recovered (as is described below) by extracting it from the generated charge carriers.

=== Free charge carrier interactions ===
The free charge carriers within silicon can both absorb photons and change its refractive index. This is particularly significant at high intensities and for long durations, due to the carrier concentration being built up by TPA. The influence of free charge carriers is often (but not always) unwanted, and various means have been proposed to remove them. One such scheme is to implant the silicon with helium in order to enhance carrier recombination. A suitable choice of geometry can also be used to reduce the carrier lifetime. Rib waveguides (in which the waveguides consist of thicker regions in a wider layer of silicon) enhance both the carrier recombination at the silica-silicon interface and the diffusion of carriers from the waveguide core.

A more advanced scheme for carrier removal is to integrate the waveguide into the intrinsic region of a PIN diode, which is reverse biased so that the carriers are attracted away from the waveguide core. A more sophisticated scheme still, is to use the diode as part of a circuit in which voltage and current are out of phase, thus allowing power to be extracted from the waveguide. The source of this power is the light lost to two photon absorption, and so by recovering some of it, the net loss (and the rate at which heat is generated) can be reduced.

As is mentioned above, free charge carrier effects can also be used constructively, in order to modulate the light.

=== Second-order nonlinearity ===
Second-order nonlinearities cannot exist in bulk silicon because of the centrosymmetry of its crystalline structure. By applying strain however, the inversion symmetry of silicon can be broken. This can be obtained for example by depositing a silicon nitride layer on a thin silicon film. Second-order nonlinear phenomena can be exploited for optical modulation, spontaneous parametric down-conversion, parametric amplification, ultra-fast optical signal processing and mid-infrared generation. Efficient nonlinear conversion however requires phase matching between the optical waves involved. Second-order nonlinear waveguides based on strained silicon can achieve phase matching by dispersion-engineering. So far, however, experimental demonstrations are based only on designs which are not phase matched. It has been shown that phase matching can be obtained as well in silicon double slot waveguides coated with a highly nonlinear organic cladding and in periodically strained silicon waveguides.

=== The Raman effect ===
Silicon exhibits the Raman effect, in which a photon is exchanged for a photon with a slightly different energy, corresponding to an excitation or a relaxation of the material. Silicon's Raman transition is dominated by a single, very narrow frequency peak, which is problematic for broadband phenomena such as Raman amplification, but is beneficial for narrowband devices such as Raman lasers. Early studies of Raman amplification and Raman lasers started at UCLA which led to demonstration of net gain Silicon Raman amplifiers and silicon pulsed Raman laser with fiber resonator (Optics express 2004). Consequently, all-silicon Raman lasers have been fabricated in 2005.

=== The Brillouin effect ===
In the Raman effect, photons are red- or blue-shifted by optical phonons with a frequency of about 15 THz. However, silicon waveguides also support acoustic phonon excitations. The interaction of these acoustic phonons with light is called Brillouin scattering. The frequencies and mode shapes of these acoustic phonons are dependent on the geometry and size of the silicon waveguides, making it possible to produce strong Brillouin scattering at frequencies ranging from a few MHz to tens of GHz. Stimulated Brillouin scattering has been used to make narrowband optical amplifiers as well as all-silicon Brillouin lasers. The interaction between photons and acoustic phonons is also studied in the field of cavity optomechanics, although 3D optical cavities are not necessary to observe the interaction. For instance, besides in silicon waveguides the optomechanical coupling has also been demonstrated in fibers and in chalcogenide waveguides.

== Solitons ==
The evolution of light through silicon waveguides can be approximated with a cubic nonlinear Schrödinger equation, which is notable for admitting sech-like soliton solutions. These optical solitons (which are also known in optical fiber) result from a balance between self phase modulation (which causes the leading edge of the pulse to be redshifted and the trailing edge blueshifted) and anomalous group velocity dispersion. Such solitons have been observed in silicon waveguides, by groups at the universities of Columbia, Rochester, and Bath.

== See also ==
- Photonic integrated circuit
- Optical computing
- Silicon Photonics Cloud
