= Modulating retro-reflector =

Signal-controlled light-reflecting device

Modulating retro-reflector technology overview.

A modulating retro-reflector (MRR) system combines an optical retro-reflector and an optical modulator to allow optical communications and sometimes other functions such as programmable signage.

Free space optical communication technology has emerged in recent years as an attractive alternative to the conventional radio frequency (RF) systems. This emergence is due in large part to the increasing maturity of lasers and compact optical systems that enable exploitation of the inherent advantages (over RF) of the much shorter wavelengths characteristic of optical and near-infrared carriers:

- Larger bandwidth
- Low probability of intercept
- Immunity from interference or jamming
- Frequency spectrum allocation issue relief
- Smaller, lighter, lower power

== Technology ==
An MRR couples or combines an optical retroreflector with a modulator to reflect modulated optical signals directly back to an optical receiver or transceiver, allowing the MRR to function as an optical communications device without emitting its own optical power. This can allow the MRR to communicate optically over long distances without needing substantial on-board power supplies. The function of the retroreflection component is to direct the reflection back to or near to the source of the light. The modulation component changes the intensity of the reflection. The idea applies to optical communication in a broad sense including not only laser-based data communications but also human observers and road signs. A number of technologies have been proposed, investigated, and developed for the modulation component, including actuated micromirrors, frustrated total internal reflection, electro-optic modulators (EOMs), piezo-actuated deflectors, multiple quantum well (MQW) devices, and liquid crystal modulators, though any one of numerous known optical modulation technologies could be used in theory. These approaches have many advantages and disadvantages relative to one another with respect to such features as power use, speed, modulation range, compactness, retroreflection divergence, cost, and many others.

In a typical optical communications arrangement, the MRR with its related electronics is mounted on a convenient platform and connected to a host computer which has the data that are to be transferred. A remotely located optical transmitter/receiver system usually consisting of a laser, telescope, and detector provides an optical signal to the modulating retro-reflector. The incident light from the transmitter system is both modulated by the MRR and reflected directly back toward the transmitter (via the retroreflection property). Figure 1 illustrates the concept.

One modulating retro-reflector at the Naval Research Laboratory (NRL) in the United States uses a semiconductor based MQW shutter capable of modulation rates up to 10 Mbit/s, depending on link characteristics. (See "Modulating Retro-reflector Using Multiple Quantum Well Technology", U.S. Patent No. 6,154,299, awarded November, 2000.)

The optical nature of the technology provides communications that are not susceptible to issues related to electromagnetic frequency allocation. The multiple quantum well modulating retro-reflector has the added advantages of being compact, lightweight, and requires very little power. The small-array MRR provides up to an order of magnitude in consumed power savings over an equivalent RF system. However, MQW modulators also have relatively small modulation ranges compared to other technologies.

The concept of a modulating retro-reflector is not new, dating back to the 1940s. Various demonstrations of such devices have been built over the years, though the demonstration of the first MQW MRR in 1993 was notable in achieving significant data rates. However, MRRs are still not widely used, and most research and development in that area is confined to rather exploratory military applications, as free-space optical communications in general tends to be a rather specialized niche technology.

Qualities often considered desirable in MRRs (obviously depending on the application) include a high switching speed, low power consumption, large area, wide field-of-view, and high optical quality. It should also function at certain wavelengths where appropriate laser sources are available, be radiation-tolerant (for non-terrestrial applications), and be rugged. Mechanical shutters and ferroelectric liquid crystal (FLC) devices, for example, are too slow, heavy, or are not robust enough for many applications. Some modulating retro-reflector systems are desired to operate at data rates of megabits per second (Mbit/s) and higher and over large temperature ranges characteristic of installation out-of-doors and in space.

=== Multiple Quantum Well Modulators ===
Semiconductor MQW modulators are one of the few technologies that meet all the requirements need for United States Navy applications, and consequently the Naval Research Laboratory is particularly active in developing and promoting that approach. When used as a shutter, MQW technology offers many advantages: it is robust solid state, operates at low voltages (less than 20 mV) and low power (tens of milliWatts), and is capable of very high switching speeds. MQW modulators have been run at Gbit/s data rates in fiber optic applications.

When a moderate (~15V) voltage is placed across the shutter in reverse bias, the absorption feature changes, shifting to longer wavelengths and dropping in magnitude. Thus, the transmission of the device near this absorption feature changes dramatically, allowing a signal can be encoded in an on-off-keying format onto the carrier interrogation beam.

This modulator consists of 75 periods of InGaAs wells surrounded by AlGaAs barriers. The device is grown on an n-type GaAs wafer and is capped by a p-type contact layer, thus forming a PIN diode. This device is a transmissive modulator designed to work at a wavelength of 980 nm, compatible with many good laser diode sources. These materials have very good performance operating in reflection architectures. Choice of modulator type and configuration architecture is application-dependent.

Once grown, the wafer is fabricated into discrete devices using a multi-step photolithography process consisting of etching and metallization steps. The NRL experimental devices have a 5 mm aperture, though larger devices are possible and are being designed and developed. It is important to point out that while MQW modulators have been used in many applications to date, modulators of such a large size are uncommon and require special fabrication techniques.

MQW modulators are inherently quiet devices, accurately reproducing the applied voltage as a modulated waveform. An important parameter is contrast ratio, defined as I_{max}/I_{min}. This parameter affects the overall signal-to-noise ratio. Its magnitude depends on the drive voltage applied to the device and the wavelength of the interrogating laser relative to the exciton peak. The contrast ratio increases as the voltage goes up until a saturation value is reached. Typically, the modulators fabricated at NRL have had contrast ratios between 1.75:1 to 4:1 for applied voltages between 10 V and 25 V, depending on the structure.

There are three important considerations in the manufacture and fabrication of a given device: inherent maximum modulation rate vs. aperture size; electrical power consumption vs. aperture size; and yield.

=== Inherent Maximum Modulation Rate vs. Aperture Size ===
The fundamental limit in the switching speed of the modulator is the resistance-capacitance limit. A key tradeoff is area of the modulator vs. area of the clear aperture. If the modulator area is small, the capacitance is small, hence the modulation rate can be faster. However, for longer application ranges on the order of several hundred meters, larger apertures are needed to close the link. For a given modulator, the speed of the shutter scales inversely as the square of the modulator diameter.

=== Electrical Power Consumption vs. Aperture Size ===
When the drive voltage waveform is optimized, the electrical power consumption of a MQW modulating retro-reflector varies as:

D_{mod}^{4} * V^{2} B^{2} R_{s}

Where D_{mod} is the diameter of the modulator, V is the voltage applied to the modulator (fixed by the required optical contrast ratio), B is the maximum data rate of the device, and R_{S} is the sheet resistance of the device. Thus a large power penalty may be paid for increasing the diameter of the MQW shutter.

=== Yield ===
MQW devices must be operated at high reverse bias fields to achieve good contrast ratios. In perfect quantum well material this is not a problem, but the presence of a defect in the semiconductor crystal can cause the device to break down at voltages below those necessary for operation. Specifically, a defect will cause an electrical short that prevents development of the necessary electrical field across the intrinsic region of the PIN diode. The larger the device the higher the probability of such a defect. Thus, If a defect occurs in the manufacture of a large monolithic device, the whole shutter is lost.

To address these issues, NRL has designed and fabricated segmented devices as well as monolithic modulators. That is, a given modulator might be "pixellated" into several segments, each driven with the same signal. This technique means that speed can be achieved as well as larger apertures. The "pixellization" inherently reduces the sheet resistance of the device, decreasing the resistance-capacitance time and reducing electrical power consumption. For example, a one centimeter monolithic device might require 400 mW to support a one Mbit/s link. A similar nine segmented device would require 45 mW to support the same link with the same overall effective aperture. A transmissive device with nine "pixels" with an overall diameter of 0.5 cm was shown to support over 10 Mbit/s.

This fabrication technique allows for higher speeds, larger apertures, and increased yield. If a single "pixel" is lost due to defects but is one of nine or sixteen, the contrast ratio necessary to provide the requisite signal-to-noise to close a link is still high. There are considerations that make fabrication of a segmented device more complicated, including bond wire management on the device, driving multiple segments, and temperature stabilization.

An additional important characteristic of the modulator is its optical wavefront quality. If the modulator causes aberrations in the beam, the returned optical signal will be attenuated and insufficient light may be present to close the link.

== Applications ==
MMR systems are used in:

- Ground-to-Air Communications
- Ground-to-Satellite Communications
- Internal Electronics Bus Interaction/Communication
- Inter, Intra-Office Communications
- Vehicle-to-Vehicle Communications
- Industrial Manufacturing

== See also ==
- Free-space optical communication
- Optical Communications
- Retro-reflector
