= Gregory Raybon =

American engineer

Gregory Raybon is an engineer at Bell Labs in New Providence, New Jersey. He was named a Fellow of the Institute of Electrical and Electronics Engineers (IEEE) in 2016 for his contributions to high-speed optical communication systems.
