= Slot-waveguide =

A slot-waveguide is an optical waveguide that guides strongly confined light in a subwavelength-scale low refractive index region by total internal reflection.

A slot-waveguide consists of two strips or slabs of high-refractive-index (n_{H}) materials separated by a subwavelength-scale low-refractive-index (n_{S}) slot region and surrounded by low-refractive-index (n_{C}) cladding materials.

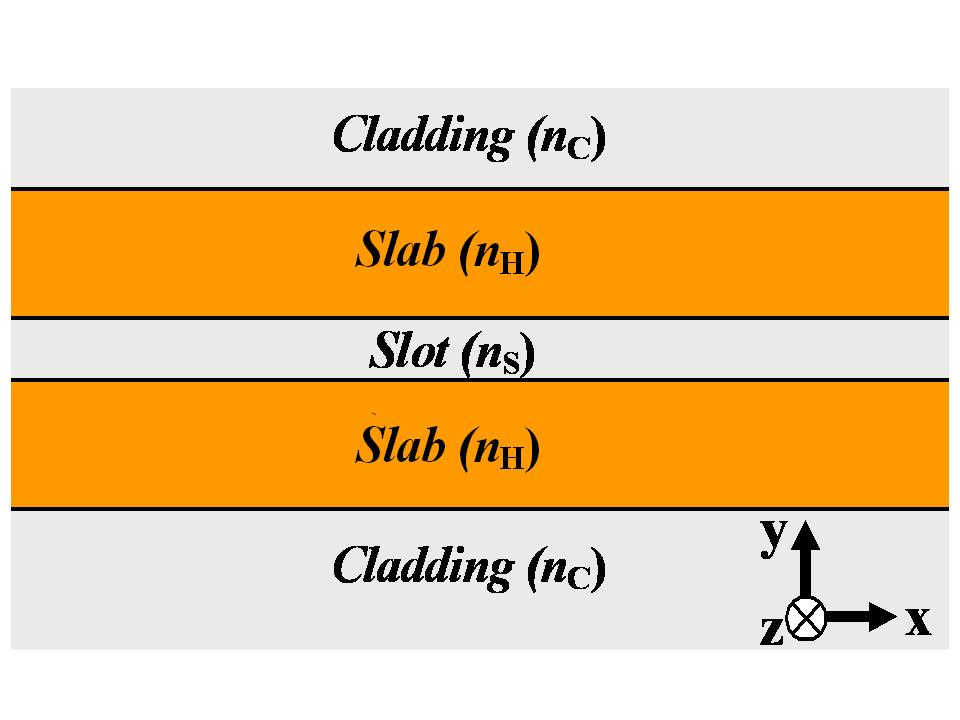
Schematic 2D slot-waveguide. Light propagates in the z-direction

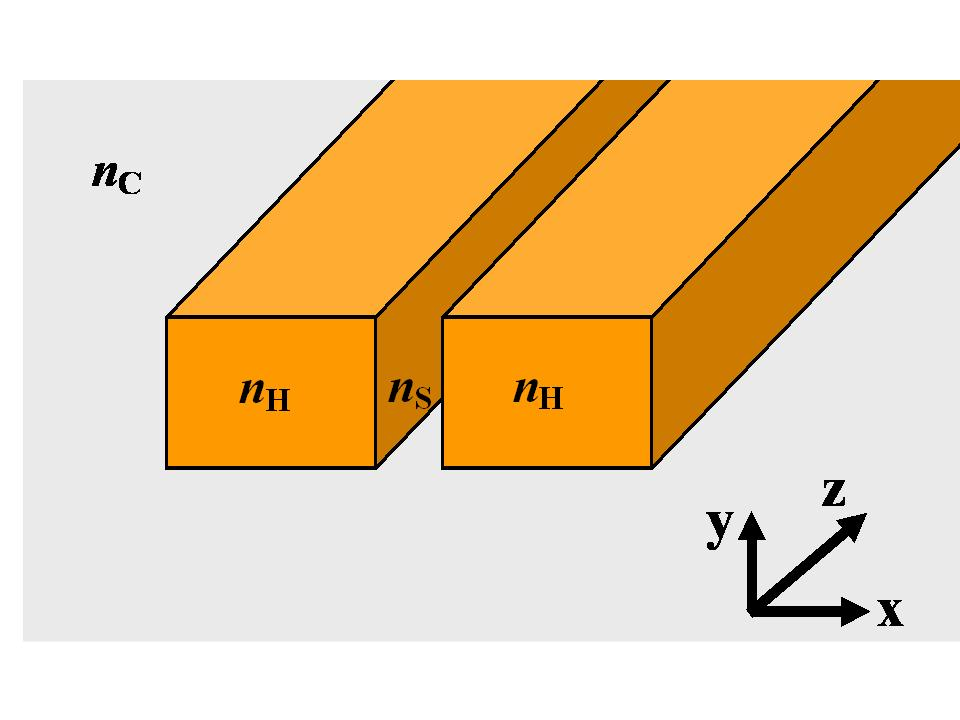
Schematic 3D slot-waveguide. Light propagates in the z-direction

== Principle of operation ==
The principle of operation of a slot-waveguide is based on the discontinuity of the electric field (E-field) at high-refractive-index-contrast interfaces. Maxwell's equations state that, to satisfy the continuity of the normal component of the electric displacement field D at an interface, the corresponding E-field must undergo a discontinuity with higher amplitude in the low-refractive-index side. That is, at an interface between two regions of dielectric constants ε_{S} and ε_{H}, respectively:

D_{S}^{N}=D_{H}^{N}
ε_{S}E_{S}^{N}=ε_{H}E_{H}^{N}
n_{S}^{2}E_{S}^{N}=n_{H}^{2}E_{H}^{N}

where the superscript N indicates the normal components of D and E vector fields. Thus, if n_{S} < <n_{H}, then E_{S}^{N}>>E_{H}^{N}.

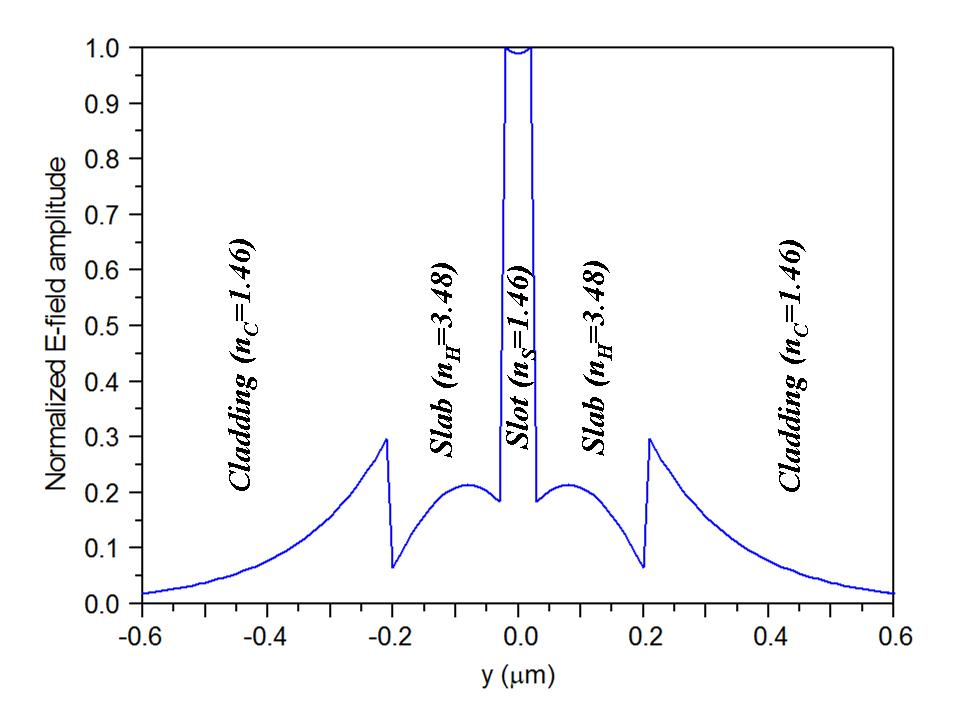
E-field profile of a 2D slot-waveguide. E-vector is parallel to the y-axis

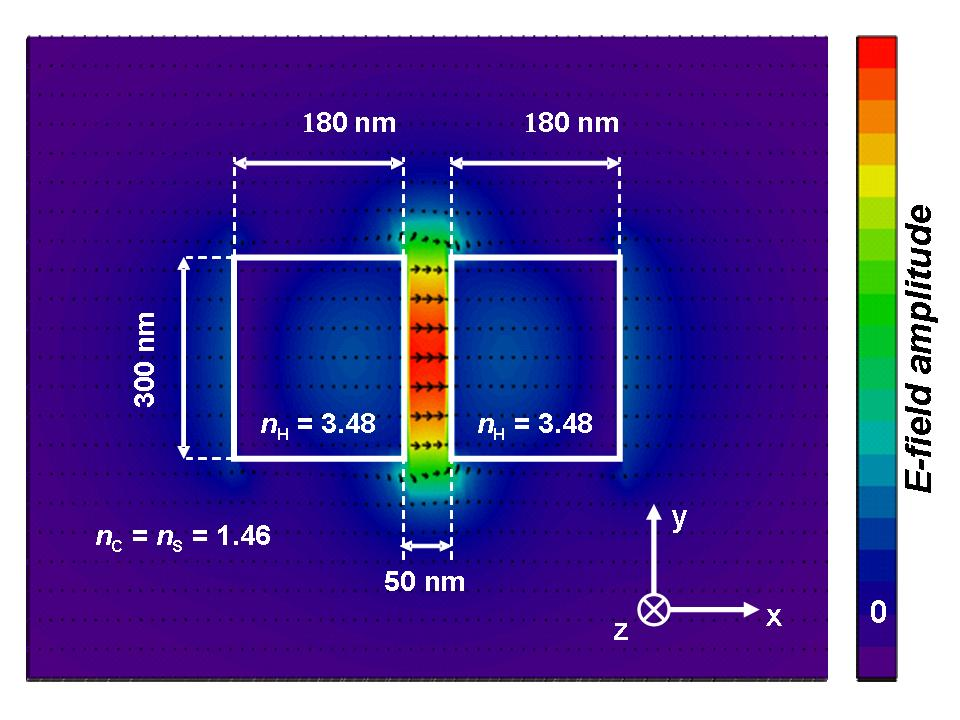
E-field distribution of a 3D slot-waveguide. Major E-field component is parallel to the x-axis

Given that the slot critical dimension (distance between the high-index slabs or strips) is comparable to the exponential decay length of the fundamental eigenmode of the guided-wave structure, the resulting E-field normal to the high-index-contrast interfaces is enhanced in the slot and remains high across it. The power density in the slot is much higher than that in the high-index regions. Since wave propagation is due to total internal reflection, there is no interference effect involved and the slot-structure exhibits very low wavelength sensitivity.

== Invention ==
The slot-waveguide was born in 2003 as an unexpected outcome of theoretical studies on metal-oxide-semiconductor (MOS) electro-optic modulation in high-confinement silicon photonic waveguides by Vilson Rosa de Almeida and Carlos Angulo Barrios, then a Ph.D. student and a postdoctoral associate, respectively, at Cornell University. Theoretical analysis and experimental demonstration of the first slot-waveguide implemented in the Si/SiO_{2} material system at 1.55 μm operation wavelength were reported by Cornell researchers in 2004.

Since these pioneering works, several guided-wave configurations based on the slot-waveguide concept have been proposed and demonstrated. Relevant examples are the following:

In 2005, researchers at the Massachusetts Institute of Technology proposed to use multiple slot regions in the same guided-wave structure (multi-slot waveguide) in order to increase the optical field in the low-refractive-index regions. The experimental demonstration of such multiple slot waveguide in a horizontal configuration was first published in 2007.

In 2006, the slot-waveguide approach was extended to the terahertz frequency band by researchers at RWTH Aachen University. Researchers at the California Institute of Technology also demonstrated that a slot waveguide, in combination with nonlinear electrooptic polymers, could be used to build ring modulators with exceptionally high tunability. Later this same principle enabled Baehr-Jones et al. to demonstrate a mach-zehnder modulator with an exceptionally low drive voltage of 0.25 V

In 2007, a non-planar implementation of the slot-waveguide principle of operation was demonstrated by researchers at the University of Bath. They showed concentration of optical energy within a subwavelength-scale air hole running down the length of a photonic-crystal fiber.

Recently, in 2016, it is shown that slots in a pair of waveguides if off-shifted away from each other can enhance the coupling coefficient even more than 100% if optimized properly, and thus the effective power coupling length between the waveguides can significantly be reduced. Hybrid slot (having vertical slot in one waveguide and horizontal slot in the other) assisted polarization beam splitter is also numerically demonstrated. Though, the losses are high for such slot structures, this scheme exploiting the asymmetric slots may have potential to design very compact optical directional couplers and polarization beam splitters for on-chip integrated optical devices.

The slot waveguide bend is another structure essential to the waveguide design of several Integrated micro- and nano-optics devices. One of the benefits of waveguide bends is the reduction of the footprint size of the device. There are two approaches based on the similarity of Si rails width to form the sharp bend in slot waveguide, which are the symmetric and asymmetric slot waveguides.

== Fabrication ==
Planar slot-waveguides have been fabricated in different material systems such as Si/SiO_{2} and Si_{3}N_{4}/SiO_{2}. Both vertical (slot plane is normal to the substrate plane) and horizontal (slot plane is parallel to the substrate plane) configurations have been implemented by using conventional micro- and nano-fabrication techniques. These processing tools include electron beam lithography, photolithography, chemical vapour deposition [usually low-pressure chemical vapour deposition (LPCVD) or plasma enhanced chemical vapour deposition (PECVD)], thermal oxidation, reactive-ion etching and focused ion beam.

In vertical slot-waveguides, the slot and strips widths are defined by electron- or photo-lithography and dry etching techniques whereas in horizontal slot-waveguides the slot and strips thicknesses are defined by a thin-film deposition technique or thermal oxidation. Thin film deposition or oxidation provides better control of the layers dimensions and smoother interfaces between the high-index-contrast materials than lithography and dry etching techniques. This makes horizontal slot-waveguides less sensitive to scattering optical losses due to interface roughness than vertical configurations.

Fabrication of a non-planar (fiber-based) slot-waveguide configuration has also been demonstrated by means of conventional microstructured optical fiber technology.

== Applications ==
A slot-waveguide produces high E-field amplitude, optical power, and optical intensity in low-index materials at levels that cannot be achieved with conventional waveguides. This property allows highly efficient interaction between fields and active materials, which may lead to all-optical switching, optical amplification and optical detection on integrated photonics. Strong E-field confinement can be localized in a nanometer-scale low-index region. As firstly pointed out in, the slot waveguide can be used to greatly increase the sensitivity of compact optical sensing devices or to enhance the efficiency of near-field optics probes. At Terahertz frequencies, slot waveguide based splitter has been designed which allows for low loss propagation of Terahertz waves. The device acts as a splitter through which maximum throughput can be achieved by adjusting the arm length ratio of the input to the output side.
