= Milton Feng =

American inventor

Milton Feng (born 1950) co-created the first transistor laser, working with Nick Holonyak in 2004. The paper discussing their work was voted in 2006 as one of the five most important papers published by the American Institute of Physics since its founding 75 years ago. In addition to the invention of the transistor laser, he is also well known for inventions of other "major breakthrough" devices, including the world's fastest transistor and light-emitting transistor (LET). As of May 2009, he is a professor at the University of Illinois at Urbana–Champaign and holds the Nick Holonyak Jr. Endowed Chair Professorship.

Feng was born and raised in Taiwan.

== Inventions ==
=== World's fastest transistor ===
In 2003, Milton Feng and his graduate students Walid Hafez and Jie-Wei Lai broke the record for the world's fastest transistor. Their device, made of indium phosphide and indium gallium arsenide with 25 nm thick base and 75 nm thick collector, marked a frequency of 509 GHz, which was 57 GHz faster than the previous record.

In 2005, they succeeded in fabricating a device at the Micro and Nanotechnology Laboratory to break their own record, reaching 604 GHz.

In 2006, Feng and his other graduate student William Snodgrass fabricated an indium phosphide and indium gallium arsenide device with a 12.5 nm thick base, operating at 765 GHz at room temperature and 845 GHz at -55 °C.

=== Light-emitting transistor ===
Reported in the January 5 issue of the journal Applied Physics Letters in 2004, Milton Feng and Nick Holonyak, the inventor of the first practical light-emitting diode (LED) and the first semiconductor laser to operate in the visible spectrum, made the world's first light-emitting transistor. This hybrid device, fabricated by Feng's graduate student Walid Hafez, had one electrical input and two outputs (electrical output and optical output) and operated at a frequency of 1 MHz. The device was made of indium gallium phosphide, indium gallium arsenide, and gallium arsenide, and emitted infrared photons from the base layer.

=== Transistor laser ===
Described in the November 15 issue of the journal Applied Physics Letters in 2004, Milton Feng, Nick Holonyak, postdoctoral research associate Gabriel Walter, and graduate research assistant Richard Chan demonstrated operation of the first heterojunction bipolar transistor laser by incorporating a quantum well in the active region of a light-emitting transistor. As with a light-emitting transistor, the transistor laser was made of indium gallium phosphide, indium gallium arsenide, and gallium arsenide, but emitted a coherent beam by stimulated emission, which differed from their previous device that only emitted incoherent photons. Despite their success, the device was not useful for practical purposes since it only operated at low temperatures—about minus 75 Celsius degrees.

Within a year, though, the researchers finally fabricated a transistor laser operating at room temperature by using metal organic chemical vapor deposition (MOCVD), as reported in the September 26 issue of the same journal. At this time, the transistor laser had a 14-layer structure, including aluminium gallium arsenide optical confining layers and indium gallium arsenide quantum wells. The emitting cavity was 2,200 nm wide and 0.85 mm long, and had continuous modes at 1,000 nm. In addition, it had a threshold current of 40 mA and direct modulation of the laser at 3 GHz.

== Recognition ==
- In 2006, Transistor laser was the most popular Top 10-Science Story (rank #4) on EurekAlert by American Association for the Advancement of Science (AAAS).
- In 2006, American Institute of Physics selected "Room Temperature Continuous Wave Operation of a Heterojunction Bipolar Transistor Laser" as top 5 paper published in the 43 years history of Applied Physics Letters.
- In 2005, Discover Magazine selected Transistor Laser as top 100 most important discovery.
- In 2013, he received the R.W. Wood Prize from OSA, where he is also a Fellow.

== See also ==
- Nick Holonyak
- UIUC College of Engineering
- University of Illinois at Urbana–Champaign
