= Silicon Photonics Cloud =

Web-based research tool

Silicon Photonics Cloud (SiCloud) is an instructional web-based research tool for silicon photonics developed at UCLA under the National Science Foundation-funded CIAN research center.

== Introduction ==
SiCloud’s provides instructional and research web-based tools. Such interactive learning tools provide two important benefits that enhance traditional teaching methods: They can be accessed by anyone from anywhere and interactive tools engage the brain in a way different from merely reading, and so enhance and reinforce the learning experience.

Silicon photonics is a platform for manufacturing low cost and high bandwidth communication components for data centers and distributed computing, storage and network systems. It has transitioned from research to industry with participation by most major semiconductor companies as well as myriad startups. Understanding this field may be challenging for researchers and students alike, as silicon photonics involves a wide range of disciplines, including material science, semiconductor physics, electronics and waveguide optics. This field has been recognized by the Forbes magazine as "The $100B Opportunity".

== Features ==
This web-based calculator is an interactive analysis tool for optical properties of silicon and related material (SiO_{2}, Si_{3}N_{4}, Al_{2}O_{3}, etc.). It is designed to be a one stop resource for students, researchers and design engineers. The first and most basic aspect of Silicon Photonics is the Material Parameters, which provides the foundation for the Device, Sub-System and System levels.

In the Material Parameters tab, one may study the physical properties of the materials commonly used in silicon photonics. SiCloud includes the common dielectrics and semiconductors for waveguide core, cladding, and photodetection, as well as metals for electrical contacts. In the Main Graph, one may examine several physical parameters of interest for each material, in different wavelength ranges, and choose between frequency and free-space wavelength for convenience. SiCloud also includes citations for the original data so that users may gather the raw data and be self-assured of its accuracy and conditions.

For silicon in particular, SiCloud includes a large number of parameters beyond refractive index and absorption coefficient, including the thermo-optic coefficient, Raman gain coefficient, Kerr coefficient, and two-photon absorption coefficient. One important consideration of a researcher is the optical loss in a given length of material, and so SiCloud provides a loss graph. Here, one may observe total material absorption, but also consider the reflection loss due to, e.g., coupling, for a variety of materials. With two facets we can even see Fabry-Perot resonances.

== History ==
SiCloud was developed by UCLA graduate student Peter DeVore and a team of researchers at the Jalali-Lab. It is part of the educational effort funded by the Center for Integrated Access Networks Engineering Research Center) of NSF. It debuted at the 2014 CIAN Annual Meeting in Tucson, Arizona on May 14, 2014. SiCloud is a work in progress and its capability is being expanded.
