= OptoElectronics and Communications Conference =

The OptoElectronics and Communications Conference (OECC), established in 1996, is an annual conference in optoelectronics and optical communications that is held in the Asia-Pacific region. The function of the meetings are to report, discuss, exchange, and generate ideas which advance the disciplines of optoelectronics and optical communications. Communicating current and future applications related to these disciplines are also a function of these meetings. The organization publishes proceedings and scientific research articles as a result of its conferences.

== Scope ==
Topical coverage for this annual conference includes optical fiber and communication networks (architecture, performance, routing, WDM systems, WDM networks, solitons, OTDM, CDMA, and fiber nonlinearities), computer networks (protocols, security, design, algorithms, management, and modules) applications in photonics, commercial technologies (including Wireless, multimedia, virtual reality, communications, speech, and software), optoelectronic devices, semiconductor lasers, and other related topics.

== Past OECCs ==
Year	Country/Region	City	Date	Papers	Attendance
2010	Japan	Sapporo	5–9 July	470	545
2009	Hong Kong SAR	Hong Kong	13–17 July	451	491
2008	Australia	Sydney	7–11 July	464	463
2007	Japan	Yokohama	9–13 July	398	568
2006	Taiwan	Kaohsiung	3–7 July	415	452
2005	Korea (South)	Seoul	4–8 July	448	573
2004	Japan	Yokohama	12–16 July	461	634
2003	China	Shanghai	13–16 October	381	410
2002	Japan	Yokohama	8–12 July	327	607
2001	Australia	Sydney	2–5 July	274	457
2000	Japan	Chiba	11–14 July	309	717
1999	China	Beijing	18–22 October	479	500
1998	Japan	Chiba	13–16 July	290	640
1997	Korea (South)	Seoul	8–11 July	338	696
1996	Japan	Chiba	16–19 July	305	642
