= NAS Award for the Industrial Application of Science =

Science award

- Description: Award recognizing original scientific work of intrinsic importance with significant, beneficial industrial applications
- Country: United States
- Presented by: National Academy of Sciences
- Established: 1990

The NAS Award for the Industrial Application of Science is awarded by the U.S. National Academy of Sciences "for original scientific work of intrinsic scientific importance and with significant, beneficial applications in industry."

== List of Recipients ==
Source: NAS

- Shuji Nakamura (2020, sustainability) "... for his pioneering discoveries, synthesis and commercial development of Gallium nitride LEDs and their use in sustainable solid-state light sources"
- Robert H. Dennard (2017, computer science) "... for seminal contributions in the field of Microelectronics for the invention of Dynamic Random Access Memory (DRAM), and CMOS scaling."
- James C. Liao (2014, bio-energy) "... production of higher alcohols as drop-in fuel from sugars, cellulose, waste protein, or carbon dioxide."
- H. Boyd Woodruff (2011, agriculture) "... multiple antibiotics, vitamin B12, and the avermectins.."
- Robert T. Fraley (2008) "... technologies that enabled the production of the world's first transgenic crops .."
- Philip Needleman (2005) "... metabolism of arachidonic acid in physiology and pathophysiology, which generates prostacyclin and thromboxane."
- J. Craig Venter (2002) "... using expressed sequence tags in genetic analyses, ... sequencing of microbial genomes, and his leadership in ... sequencing the human genome."
- Ralph F. Hirschmann (1999) "... chemical design and synthesis ... of numerous essential pharmaceuticals, such as anti-inflammatory steroids and anti-hypertensive compounds."
- John H. Sinfelt (1996) "... discovery of the principle of bimetallic cluster catalysis and the ... catalyst widely used in making lead-free gasoline."
- Nick Holonyak (1993) "... semiconductor materials and devices, including practical light-emitting diodes."
- Carl Djerassi (1990) "contributions to steroid chemistry [and] the first successful oral contraceptive.."

== See also ==
- List of general science and technology awards
- List of National Academy of Sciences Awards
