= Robert Fraley =

American plant biologist and businessman

Robert Thomas Fraley
- Born: January 25, 1953; Danville, Illinois
- Education: University of Illinois
- Awards: Biotechnology Heritage Award, NAS Award for the Industrial Application of Science, National Medal of Technology, World Food Prize
- Scientific career
- Workplaces: Monsanto
- Thesis: Intracytoplasmic Membrane Synthesis During the Cell Division Cycle of Rhodopseudomonas Sphaeroides (1979)
- Notable students: Elizabeth E. Hood

External media

Audio
- Dr. Robb Fraley - Sharing The Stories Of Genetic Science And Its Relation To Food And Consumers, presentation audio by Dr. Fraley at the 2016 Agribusiness Council of Indiana Conference & Expo, January 18–19, 2016, Indianapolis, IN, USA

Video
- Robert Fraley of Monsanto on National Geographic's Plan to Feed a World of 9 Billion, Climate One, Jun 19, 2014

Robert Thomas Fraley (January 25, 1953, Danville, Illinois) was executive vice president and chief technology officer at Monsanto, where he helped to develop the first genetically modified seeds. He retired from Monsanto in June 2018. He advocates for the use of GMO products to address global food insecurity and reduce the environmental footprint of agriculture.

Fraley was also a technical adviser to the USDA.

== Early life and education ==
Fraley grew up on a farm near Hoopeston, Illinois. Fraley attended the University of Illinois for both his bachelors and PhD, the latter focused on microbiology and biochemistry, working with Professor Samuel Kaplan in the Department of Microbiology, and completed in 1979. He did post-doctoral research in biophysics at the University of California-San Francisco. By 1983 he was working at Monsanto, where he was able to use Agrobacterium tumefaciens to transfer genes conferring a selectable marker into the cells of petunia plants. Together with Stephen Rogers and Robert Horsch, he was able to produce petunia plants that were resistant to kanamycin.

== Recognition ==
- In 1988 Fraley was elected a fellow of the American Association for the Advancement of Science.
- Fraley received The Progressive Farmer's Man of the Year in 1995.
- In 1999 he was awarded he National Medal of Technology by President Bill Clinton.
- In 2008, he received the NAS Award for the Industrial Application of Science "for developing technologies that enabled the production of the world's first transgenic crops."
- In 2009, he received the Biotechnology Heritage Award from the Biotechnology Industry Organization (BIO) and the Chemical Heritage Foundation.
- Fraley won the 2013 World Food Prize for "breakthrough achievements in founding, developing, and applying modern agricultural biotechnology".
- Fraley was inducted as a Laureate of The Lincoln Academy of Illinois and awarded the Order of Lincoln (the State’s highest honor) by the Governor of Illinois on June 19, 2021.
