= Light-emitting transistor =

Form of transistor that emits light

Light-emitting transistor (LET)
- Working principle: Electroluminescence
- Inventor: Milton Feng; Nick Holonyak

A light-emitting transistor or LET is a form of transistor that emits light. Higher efficiency than light-emitting diode (LED) is possible.

== History ==
Reported in the January 5, 2004 issue of the journal Applied Physics Letters, Milton Feng and Nick Holonyak, the inventor of the first practical light-emitting diode (LED) and the first semiconductor laser to operate in the visible spectrum, made the world's first light-emitting transistor. This hybrid device, fabricated by Feng's graduate student Walid Hafez, had one electrical input and two outputs (electrical output and optical output) and operated at a frequency of 1 MHz. The device was made of indium gallium phosphide, indium gallium arsenide, and gallium arsenide, and emitted infrared photons from the base layer.

== Organic LET ==
An organic light-emitting transistor (OLET) is a form of transistor that emits light. These transistors have potential for digital displays and on-chip optical interconnects. OLET is a new light-emission concept, providing planar light sources that can be easily integrated in substrates like silicon, glass, and paper using standard microelectronic techniques.

OLETs differ from OLEDs in that an active matrix can be made entirely of OLETs, whereas OLEDs must be combined with switching elements such as TFTs.

== See also ==
- Organic field-effect transistor (OFET)
