= Elizabeth E. Hood =

American plant biologist

Elizabeth Ellen Hood
- Born: 1952 (age 72–73)
- Citizenship: United States
- Education: University of Oklahoma, Oklahoma State University, Washington University in St. Louis
- Awards: AAAS Fellow
- Scientific career
- Institutions: Pioneer Hi Bred, National Science Foundation, Arkansas State University
- Thesis: Ti plasmid region responsible for the hyper-virulent phenotype of Agrobacterium tumefaciens strain A281 (1985)
- Doctoral advisors: Mary-Dell Chilton and Robert Fraley

Elizabeth E. Hood is a plant geneticist and the Lipscomb Distinguished Professor of Agriculture at Arkansas State University. In 2018, she was elected a fellow of the American Association for the Advancement of Science.

== Education and career ==
Elizabeth Hood was born in 1952. She attended the University of Oklahoma earning a BA in sociology in 1974. In her masters she switched to botany, studying the biochemistry of a cyanobacteria (Anabaena variabilis). After completing her masters, she moved to Washington University in St. Louis, where she studied the natural plant genetic engineering capabilities of Agrobacterium tumefaciens as a PhD student, and studied with Mary-Dell Chilton and Robert Fraley.

From 1988 to 1994, she was an assistant professor of biology at Utah State University. After that, she worked at Pioneer Hi-Bred, and later at ProdiGene. In 2003, she became a program manager at the National Science Foundation. In 2004, she was hired at Arkansas State University. In 2008, she was appointed the Lipscomb Distinguished Professor of Agriculture.

== Research ==
During her time at Washington University in St. Louis, Elizabeth Hood created the Agrobacterium strain EHA101, which is widely used in plant transformation. Her research at Arkansas State University focuses on using plants as factories to produce large quantities of enzymes and studying how plants construct cell walls. She is the Arkansas representative for the Genomes to Fields public-private consortium working to enable to accurate phenotypic prediction in corn/maize across the different environments found in thirty different US states.
