= Russell Dupuis =

American physicist

Russell Dean Dupuis
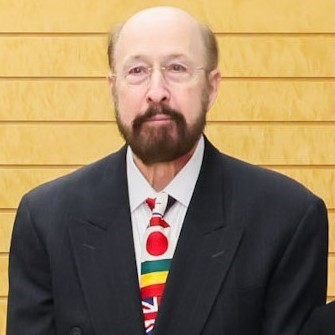
- Born: July 9, 1947 (age 78)
- Awards: IEEE Edison Medal (2007)
- Scientific career
- Fields: Electrical engineering
- Doctoral advisor: Nick Holonyak Jr.

Russell Dean Dupuis (born 9 July 1947) is an American electrical engineer and physicist.

He holds the Steve W. Chaddick Endowed Chair in Electro-Optics in the School of Electrical and Computer Engineering at Georgia Tech. He has made pioneering contributions to metalorganic chemical vapor deposition (MOCVD) and continuous-wave room-temperature quantum-well lasers. His other work has focused on III-V heterojunction devices, and LEDs.

Dupuis was elected as a member into the National Academy of Engineering in 1989 for pioneering work in metalorganic chemical vapor deposition and demonstration of heterostructure devices.

== Education ==
Dupuis earned his B.S. (1970), his M.S. (1971), and his Ph.D. (1972) in Electrical Engineering from the University of Illinois at Urbana–Champaign.

== Career history ==
Prof. Dupuis initially worked at Texas Instruments from 1973 to 1975. He joined Rockwell International in 1975, where with P. Dan Dapkus, he was the first to demonstrate that MOCVD could be used for the growth of high-quality semiconductor thin films and devices such as lasers. Then in 1979 he moved to AT&T Bell Laboratories in Murray Hill, NJ where with Ralph Logn, C.J. Pinzone & Jan van der Ziel, he was the first to demonstrate the direct growth of GaAs lasers directly on silicon that could operate CW at room temperature. He extended his work to the growth of InP-InGaAsP by MOCVD and demonstrated the first long wavelength VCSEL to operate at 1.55 micron wavelength. He moved to academia in 1989 to become a chaired professor at the University of Texas at Austin at the Microelectronics Center established by Ben G Streetman.

== Awards and memberships ==
A Georgia Research Alliance Eminent Scholar, Dupuis and two of his colleagues were awarded the 2002 National Medal of Technology by President George W. Bush for their work on developing and commercializing LEDs. He won the 1985 IEEE Morris N. Liebmann Memorial Award. In 2015, Dupuis and four others shared the Charles Stark Draper Prize in Engineering given by the U.S. National Academy of Engineering. He is a member of the National Academy of Engineering and is a Fellow of the IEEE, the American Physical Society, the American Association for the Advancement of Science, and the Optical Society of America.

Russell D. Dupuis won the 2004 John Bardeen Award and the 2007 IEEE Edison Medal. In 2025 he was awarded the Japan Prize in the field of "Materials Science and Production".
