= Optical network on chip =

Electronic communications subsystem

Optical network-on-chip (ONoC) is a new type of network on chip (NoC) for multiprocessor system-on-chip. While traditional NoC relies on electrical signals to transfer information, hence called electrical network-on-chip (ENoC), its performance and energy efficiency are bound by the significantly unbalanced scaling of on-chip global metal wires comparing to transistors. Optical telecommunications have been successful in many networking domains to replace electrical telecommunications. Riding on the achievements of photonic technologies, a wide range of studies have been done on ONoC.

== See also ==
- Optical interconnect
