= Cavity switch =

Device for time-domain cavity modulation

A cavity switch is a device that modulates cavity properties in the time domain. It is known as Q switching if the quality factor of cavities is under modulation. There are other properties such as the cavity mode volume, resonant frequency, phase delay, and optical local density of states can be switched or modulated. Cavity switches are mainly used in telecommunications and quantum electrodynamics studies.

== See also ==
- Q-switching
