= Nick Holonyak =

American electrical engineer (1928–2022)

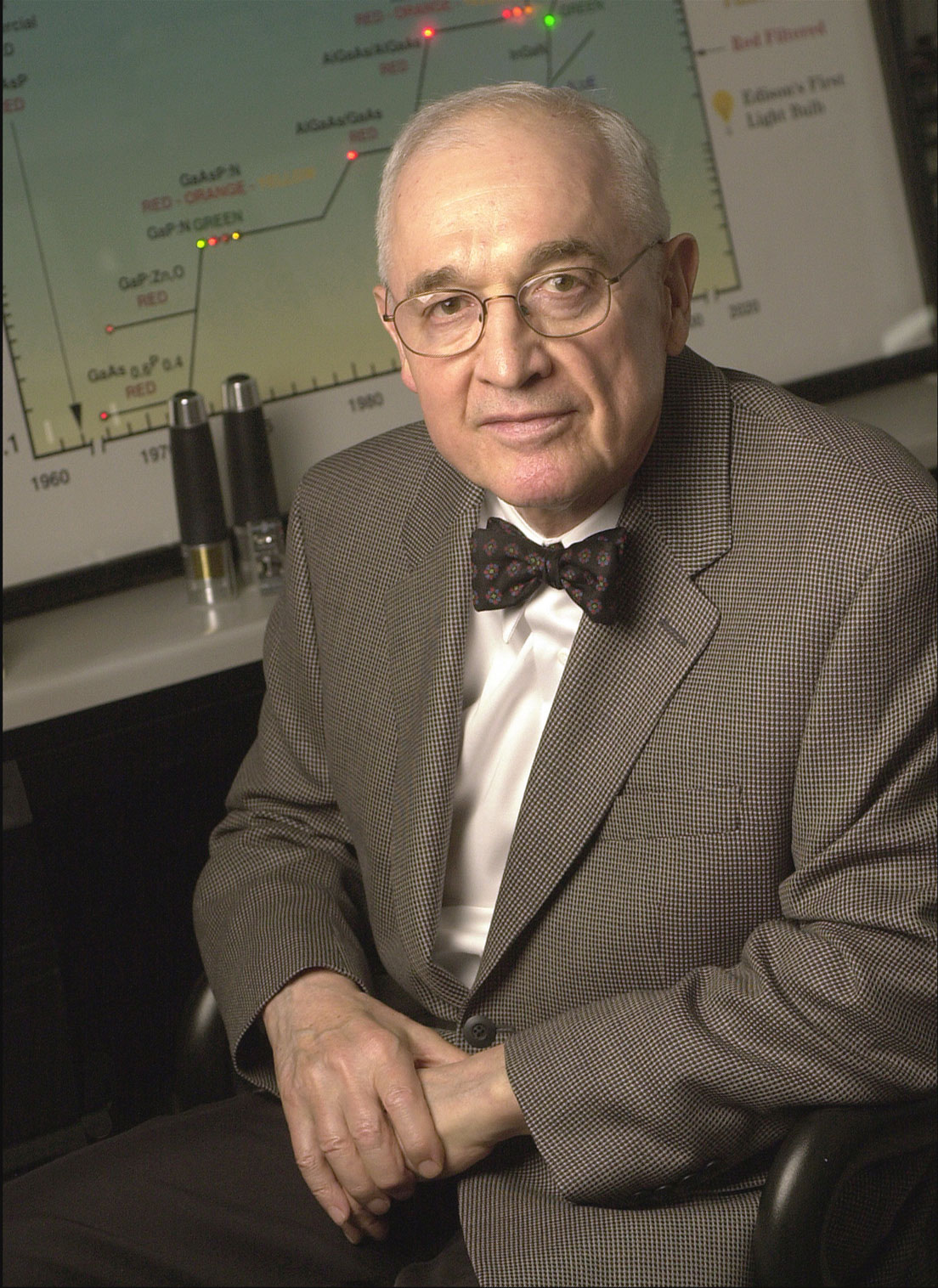
- Holonyak in 2002
- Born: Nick Holonyak Jr. November 3, 1928; Zeigler, Illinois, U.S.
- Died: September 18, 2022 (aged 93); Urbana, Illinois, U.S.
- Education: University of Illinois: B.S., Electrical Engineering; M.S., Electrical Engineering; Ph.D., Electrical Engineering
- Known for: Invention of the laser diode
- Awards: IEEE Morris N. Liebmann Memorial Award (1973); IEEE Jack A. Morton Award (1981); IEEE Edison Medal (1989); National Medal of Science (1990); Charles Hard Townes Award (1992); NAS Award for the Industrial Application of Science (1993); Japan Prize (1995); Frederic Ives Medal (2001); National Medal of Technology (2002); IEEE Medal of Honor (2003); Global Energy Prize (2003); Lemelson–MIT Prize (2004); Charles Stark Draper Prize (2015); Queen Elizabeth Prize for Engineering (2021)
- Scientific career
- Fields: Electrical engineering
- Workplaces: General Electric; University of Illinois
- Thesis: Effect of Surface Conditions on Characteristics of Rectifier Junctions (1954)
- Doctoral advisor: John Bardeen
- Doctoral students: James J. Coleman; John Dallesasse; Russell Dupuis

Nick Holonyak Jr. (November 3, 1928 – September 18, 2022) was an American electrical engineer. He is noted particularly for his 1962 invention and first demonstration of a semiconductor laser diode that emitted visible light. This device was the forerunner of the first generation of commercial light-emitting diodes (LEDs). He was then working at a General Electric research laboratory near Syracuse, New York. He left General Electric in 1963 and returned to his alma mater, the University of Illinois Urbana-Champaign, where he later became John Bardeen Endowed Chair in Electrical and Computer Engineering and Physics.

== Early life and education ==
Nick Holonyak Jr. was born on November 3, 1928, in Zeigler, Illinois, to Rusyn immigrants. The family moved to Glen Carbon, Illinois where his father worked in a coal mine. Holonyak was the first member of his family to receive any type of formal schooling. He once worked 30 straight hours on the Illinois Central Railroad before realizing that a life of hard labor was not what he wanted and he would prefer to go to school instead. According to a Chicago Tribune article in 2003, "The cheap and reliable semiconductor lasers critical to DVD players, bar code readers and scores of other devices owe their existence in some small way to the demanding workload thrust upon Downstate railroad crews decades ago."

Holonyak earned his Bachelor of Science (1950), Master of Science (1951), and Doctor of Philosophy (1954) degrees in Electrical Engineering from the University of Illinois, where he was the first graduate student of John Bardeen. In 1954, Holonyak went to Bell Telephone Laboratories, where he worked on silicon-based electronic devices. From 1955 to 1957, he served with the U.S. Army Signal Corps.

== Career and research ==
From 1957 to 1963, Holonyak was a scientist at General Electric's Advanced Semiconductor Laboratory near Syracuse, New York. Here he invented, fabricated, and demonstrated the first visible light laser diode on October 9, 1962. He grew crystals of the alloy GaAs_{0.60}P_{0.40}; a GaAs laser diode that worked in the infrared had recently been demonstrated by his General Electric colleague Robert N. Hall. The GaAs_{0.60}P_{0.40} laser diode worked at low temperatures, but the device still functioned as a light-emitting diode at room temperature. The demonstration of red light emission from the diode inspired the article "Light of Hope – or Terror" in Reader's Digest. GaAsP was the material used for the first generation of commercial LEDs that came to market a few years later.

In 1963, Holonyak became a professor at the University of Illinois. In 1993, he was named the John Bardeen Endowed Chair Professor of Electrical and Computer Engineering and Physics. He investigated methods for manufacturing quantum dot lasers. He and Dr. Milton Feng ran a transistor laser research center at the university funded by $6.5 million from the United States Department of Defense through DARPA. Holonyak retired from Illinois in 2013.

Ten of his 60 former doctoral students have developed new uses for LED technology at Philips Lumileds Lighting Company in Silicon Valley.

== Inventions ==
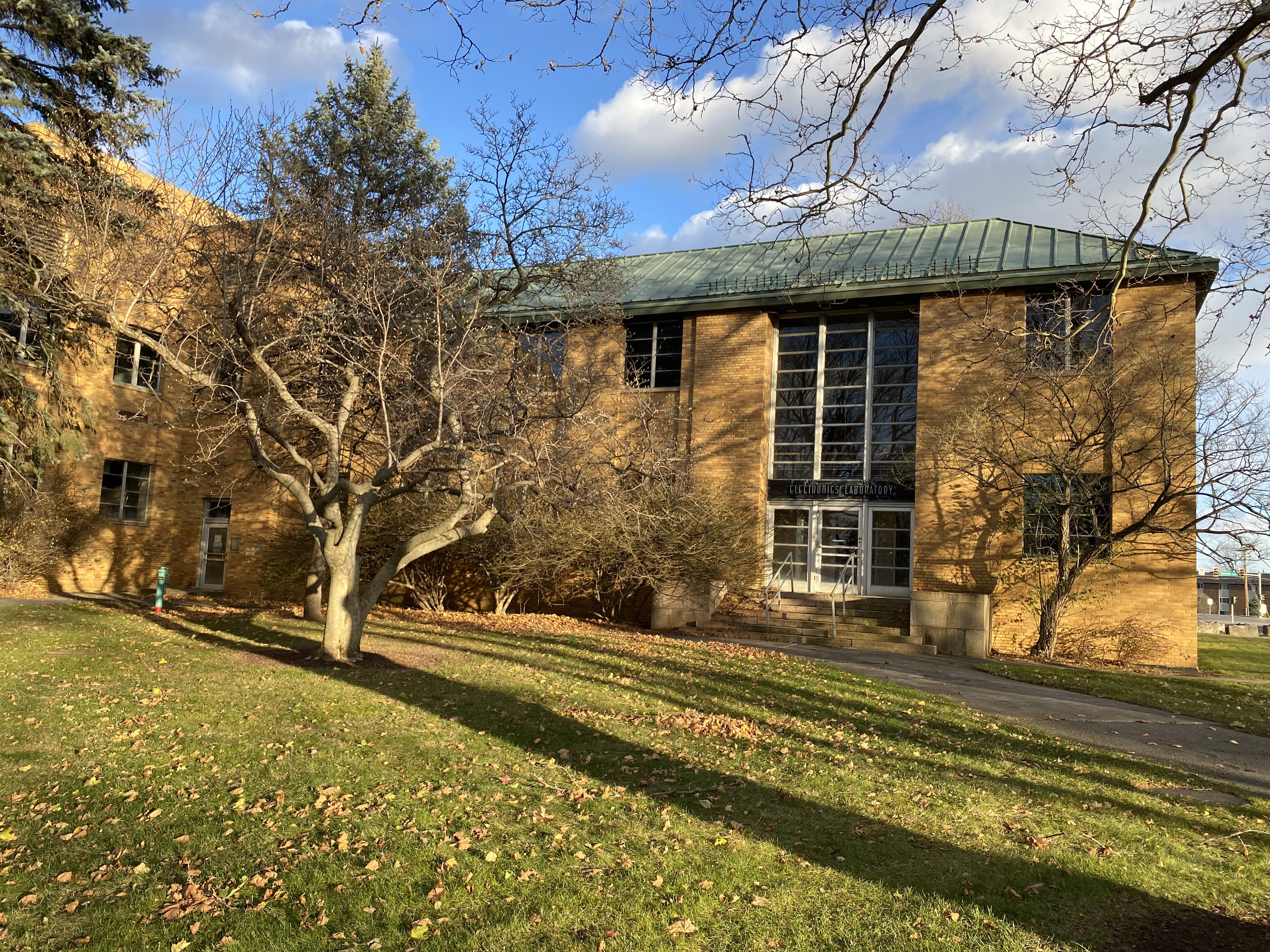
The former General Electric laboratory near Syracuse, New York, where Holonyak demonstrated red light from a diode laser and light-emitting diode in 1962.

In addition to introducing the III-V alloy LED, Holonyak held 41 patents. His other inventions include the red-light semiconductor laser, usually called the laser diode (used in CD and DVD players and cell phones) and the shorted emitter p-n-p-n switch (used in light dimmers and power tools).

In 2006, the American Institute of Physics decided on the five most important papers in each of its journals since it was founded 75 years ago. Two of these five papers, in the journal Applied Physics Letters, were co-authored by Holonyak. The first one, co-authored with S. F. Bevacqua in 1962, announced the creation of the first visible-light laser diode. The second, co-authored primarily with Milton Feng in 2005, announced the creation of a transistor laser that can operate at room temperatures. Holonyak predicted that his LEDs would replace the incandescent light bulb of Thomas Edison in the February 1963 issue of Reader's Digest, and as LEDs improve in quality and efficiency they are gradually replacing incandescents as the bulb of choice.

== Personal life ==
Holonyak and his wife, Katherine, were married for over 60 years. He died on September 18, 2022, in Urbana, Illinois, at the age of 93.

== Recognition ==
=== Memberships ===
Year	Organization	Type	Ref.
1973	National Academy of Engineering	Member	
1984	National Academy of Sciences	Member	
2015	Optical Society	Honorary Member	

=== Awards ===
Year	Organization	Award	Co-recipients	Citation	Ref.
1973	Institute of Electrical and Electronics Engineers	IEEE Morris N. Liebmann Memorial Award	—	"For outstanding contributions to the field of visible light emitting diodes and diode lasers."	
1981	Institute of Electrical and Electronics Engineers	IEEE Jack A. Morton Award	—	"For pioneering work in quantum well lasers and contributions to visible semiconductor lasers and light-emitting diodes."	
1989	Institute of Electrical and Electronics Engineers	IEEE Edison Medal	—	"For an outstanding career in the field of electrical engineering with contributions to major advances in the field of semiconductor materials and devices."	
1990	National Science Foundation	National Medal of Science	—	"For his contributions as one of the Nation’s most prolific inventors in the area of semiconductor materials and devices, and for his role as research mentor while working at the forefront of solid-state science and technology."	
1992	Optical Society of America	Charles Hard Townes Award	—	"For his career in quantum electronics, particularly his contributions to semiconducting, light-emitting sources."	
1993	National Academy of Sciences	NAS Award for the Industrial Application of Science	—	"For his profound impact on industry and on the daily lives of the people around the world through his prolific inventions in the area of semiconductor materials and devices, including practical light-emitting diodes."	
1995	Japan Prize Foundation	Japan Prize	—	"[For] outstanding contributions to research and practical applications of light emitting diodes and lasers through pioneering achievements in the understanding of physical principles and in the process technology of intermetallic compound semiconductors."	
2001	Optical Society of America	Frederic Ives Medal	—	"For pioneering work in the field of semiconductor lasers and LEDs."	
2002	United States Patent and Trademark Office	National Medal of Technology	M. George Craford and Russell Dupuis	"For contributions to the development and commercialization of light-emitting diode (LED) technology, with applications to digital displays, consumer electronics, automotive lighting, traffic signals, and general illumination."	
2003	Institute of Electrical and Electronics Engineers	IEEE Medal of Honor	—	"For a career of pioneering contributions to semiconductors, including the growth of semiconductor alloys and heterojunctions, and to visible light-emitting diodes and injection lasers."	
2003	Global Energy Association	Global Energy Prize	—	"For his invention of the first semiconductor LEDs (light-emitting diodes) in the visible region of the light spectrum, and his role as founder of the new field of silicon electronics and micro-electronics for power applications."	
2004	Massachusetts Institute of Technology	Lemelson–MIT Prize	—	—	
2015	National Academy of Engineering	Charles Stark Draper Prize	Isamu Akasaki, M. George Craford, Russell Dupuis, and Shuji Nakamura	"For the invention, development, and commercialization of materials and processes for light-emitting diodes (LEDs)."	
2021	Queen Elizabeth Prize for Engineering Foundation	Queen Elizabeth Prize for Engineering	Isamu Akasaki, M. George Craford, Russell Dupuis, and Shuji Nakamura	"For the creation and development of LED lighting, which forms the basis of all solid state lighting technology."	

Many colleagues expressed their belief that Holonyak deserved the Nobel Prize for his invention of the GaAsP laser and LED. On this subject, he said: "It's ridiculous to think that somebody owes you something. We're lucky to be alive, when it comes down to it." In October 2014, Holonyak reversed his stance by stating "I find this one insulting" in reaction to news that the inventors of the blue LED were awarded the 2014 Nobel Prize in Physics, instead of his fellow LED researchers.

== Commemoration ==
- 1997: The Optical Society of America (now Optica) created the Nick Holonyak, Jr. Award in his honor.
- 2005: Inducted as a Laureate of The Lincoln Academy of Illinois and awarded the Order of Lincoln (the State's highest honor) by the Governor of Illinois in the area of Science.
- June 2006: Two of Holonyak's papers were chosen by the editors of Applied Physics Letters as among the five most important published since the journal's founding in 1962.
- November 9, 2007: Historical marker installed on the University of Illinois campus recognizing his development of the quantum-well laser. It is located on the Bardeen Engineering Quadrangle near where the old Electrical Engineering Research Laboratory used to stand.
- 2008: Inducted into the National Inventors Hall of Fame (Announced February 14, 2008) (May 2–3, 2008 at Akron, Ohio).
- September 2018: Village of Glen Carbon, Illinois, placed an honorary street sign on behalf of Holonyak, a former resident.
