= Parallel optical interface =

Fiber-optic technology

A parallel optical interface is a form of fiber-optic technology aimed primarily at communications and networking over relatively short distances (less than 300 meters), and at high bandwidths.

Parallel optic interfaces differ from traditional fiber-optic communication in that data is simultaneously transmitted and received over multiple fibers. Different methods exist for splitting the data over this high-bandwidth link. In the simplest form, the parallel optic link is a replacement for many serial-data communication links. In the more typical application, one byte of information is split up into bits and each bit is coded and sent across the individual fibers. Needless to say, there are many ways to perform this multiplexing provided the fundamental coding at the fiber level meets the channel requirement.

The main applications for parallel optical interfaces are found in telecommunications and supercomputers, also being introduced to consumer applications. It displaces copper backplanes that are commonly used for large switching equipment design.

There are two forms of commercially available products for parallel optic interfaces. The first is a twelve-channel system consisting of an optical transmitter and an optical receiver. The second is a four channel transceiver product that is capable of transmitting four channels and receiving four channels in one product.

Parallel optics is often the most cost-effective solution for getting 40 Gigabit per second transmission of data over distances exceeding 100 meters. 100GE Optical Transceiver comes with 100 Gigabit of data transmit. Data is delivered in both duplex and parallel mechanism with 100GE.

== See also ==
- Fiber-optic cable
- Interconnect bottleneck
- Optical communication
- Thunderbolt (interface)
