= Optical communication =

Use of light to convey information

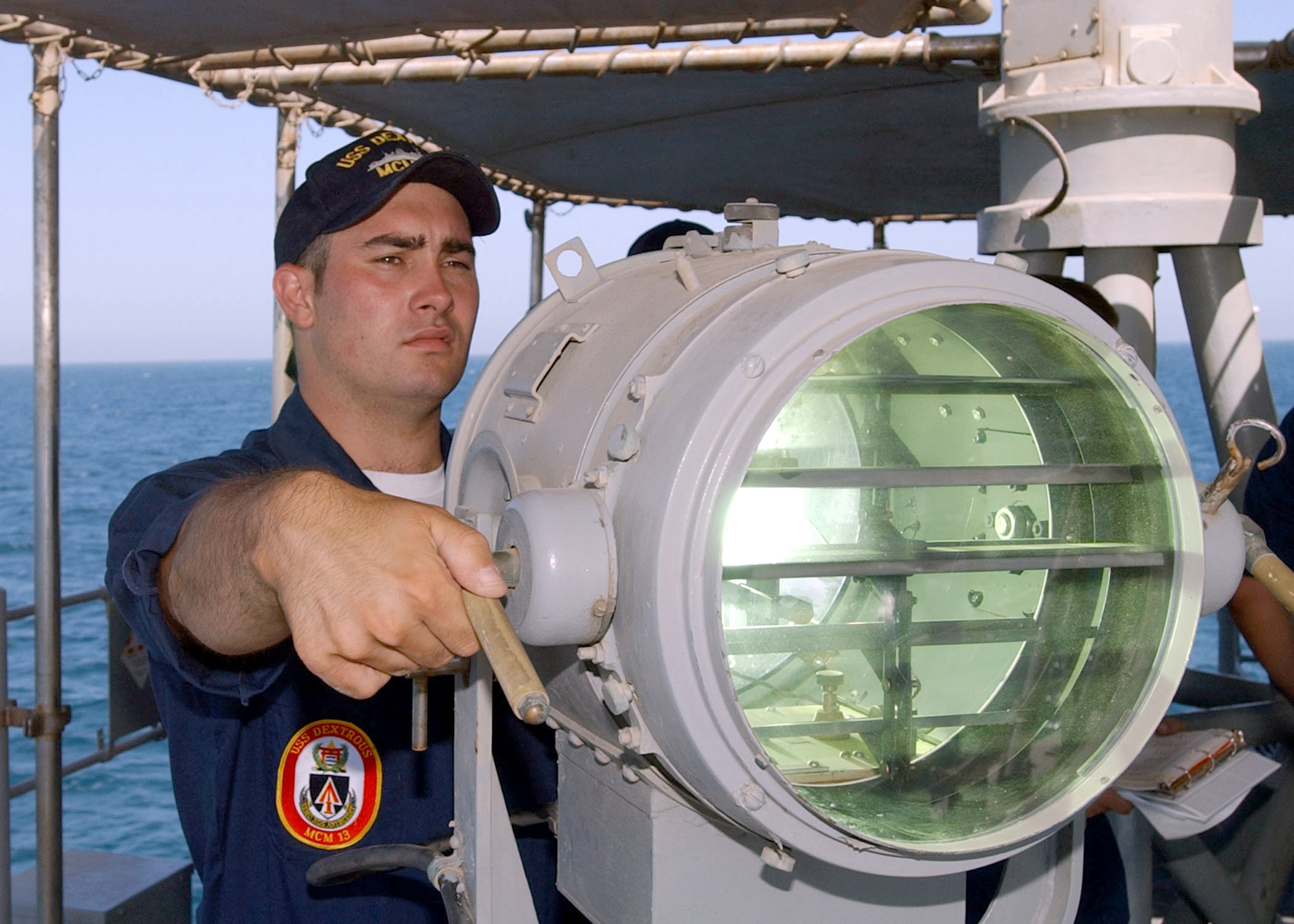
A naval signal lamp, a form of optical communication that uses shutters and is typically employed with Morse code (2002)

Optical communication or optical telecommunication (sometimes known as optical transmission), is communication at a distance using light to carry information. Optical communication can be performed visually or by using electronic devices. The earliest basic forms of optical communication date back several millennia, while the earliest electrical device created to do so was the photophone, invented in 1880.

Modern communication relies on optical networking systems using optical fiber, optical amplifiers, lasers, switches, routers, and other related technologies. Free-space optical communication use lasers to transmit signals in space, while terrestrial forms are naturally limited by geography and weather.

An optical communication system uses a transmitter, which encodes a message into an optical signal, a channel, which carries the signal to its destination, and a receiver, which reproduces the message from the received optical signal. When electronic equipment is not employed the 'receiver' is a person visually observing and interpreting a signal, which may be either simple (such as the presence of a beacon fire) or complex (such as lights using color codes or flashed in a Morse code sequence). Modern optical communication processes also may include optical encoding, optical data processing, optical modulation, and optical decoding.

== Visual forms ==
Visual techniques such as smoke signals, beacon fires, hydraulic telegraphs, ship flags and semaphore lines were the earliest forms of optical communication. Hydraulic telegraph semaphores date back to the 4th century BCE Greece. Distress flares are still used by mariners in emergencies, while lighthouses and navigation lights are used to communicate navigation hazards.

The heliograph uses a mirror to reflect sunlight to a distant observer. When a signaler tilts the mirror to reflect sunlight, the distant observer sees flashes of light that can be used to transmit a prearranged signaling code. Naval ships often use signal lamps and Morse code in a similar way.

Aircraft pilots often use visual approach slope indicator (VASI) projected light systems to land safely, especially at night. Military aircraft landing on an aircraft carrier use a similar system to land correctly on a carrier deck. The coloured light system communicates the aircraft's height relative to a standard landing glideslope. As well, airport control towers still use Aldis lamps to transmit instructions to aircraft whose radios have failed.

Sign language and lip reading are well known visual forms used to communicate with deaf people.

=== Semaphore line ===
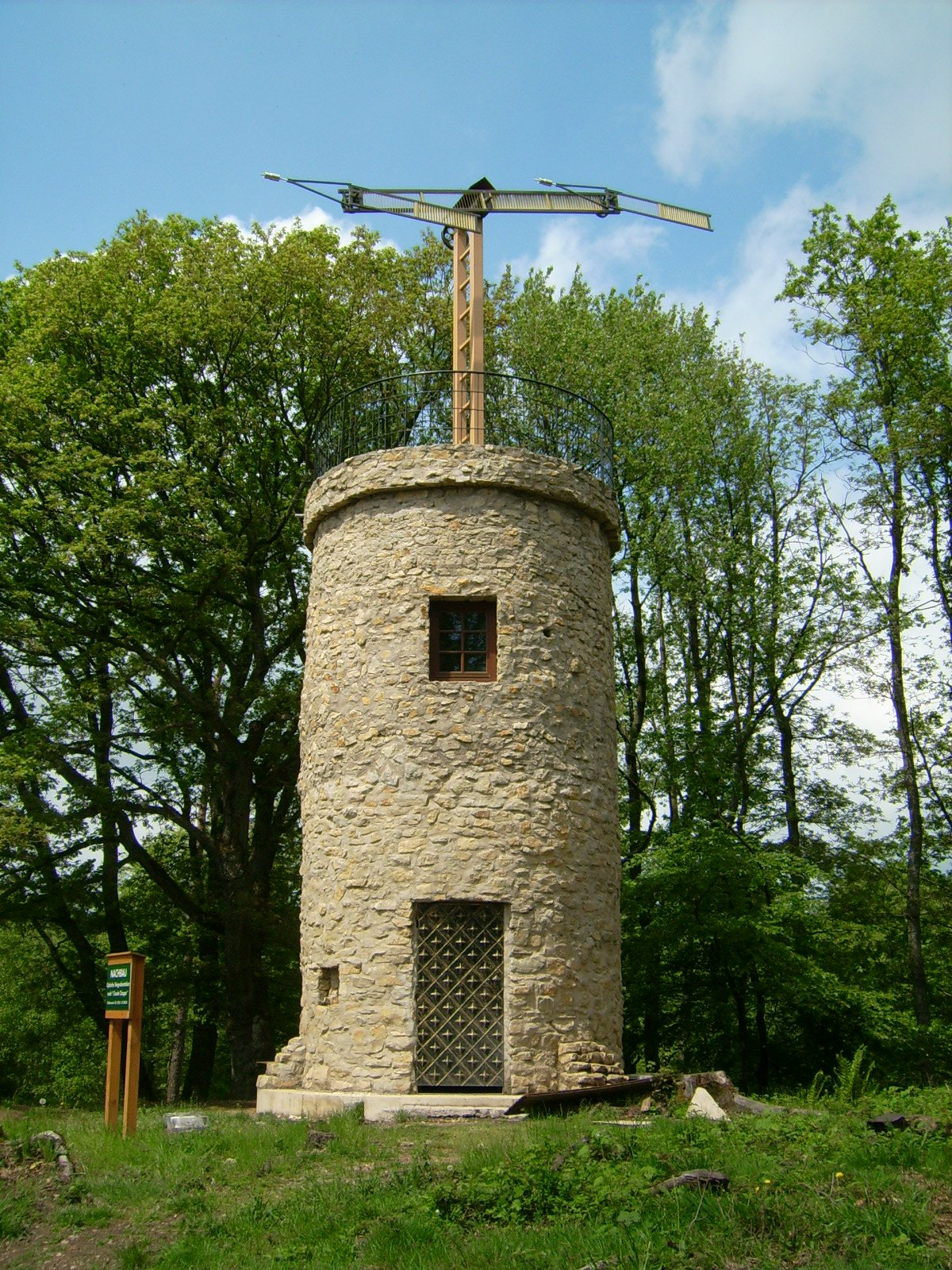
A replica of a Chappe telegraph tower (18th century)

A 'semaphore telegraph', also called a 'semaphore line', 'optical telegraph', 'shutter telegraph chain', 'Chappe telegraph', or 'Napoleonic semaphore', is a system used for conveying information by means of visual signals, using towers with pivoting arms or shutters, also known as blades or paddles. Information is encoded by the position of the mechanical elements; it is read when the shutter is in a fixed position.

Semaphore lines were a precursor of the electrical telegraph. They were far faster than post riders for conveying a message over long distances, but far more expensive and less private than the electrical telegraph lines which would later replace them. The maximum distance that a pair of semaphore telegraph stations can bridge is limited by geography, weather and the availability of light; thus, in practical use, most optical telegraphs used lines of relay stations to bridge longer distances. Each relay station would also require its complement of skilled operator-observers to convey messages back and forth across the line.

The modern design of semaphores was first foreseen by the British polymath Robert Hooke, who first gave a vivid and comprehensive outline of visual telegraphy in a 1684 submission to the Royal Society. His proposal (which was motivated by military concerns following the Battle of Vienna the preceding year) was not put into practice during his lifetime.

The first operational optical semaphore line arrived in 1792, created by the French engineer Claude Chappe and his brothers, who succeeded in covering France with a network of 556 stations stretching a total distance of 4,800 kilometres (3,000 mi). It was used for military and national communications until the 1850s.

Many national services adopted signaling systems different from the Chappe system. For example, Britain and Sweden adopted systems of shuttered panels (in contradiction to the Chappe brothers' contention that angled rods are more visible). In Spain, the engineer Agustín de Betancourt developed his own system which was adopted by that state. This system was considered by many experts in Europe better than Chappe's, even in France.

These systems were popular in the late 18th to early 19th century but could not compete with the electrical telegraph, and went completely out of service by 1880.

=== Semaphore signal flags ===
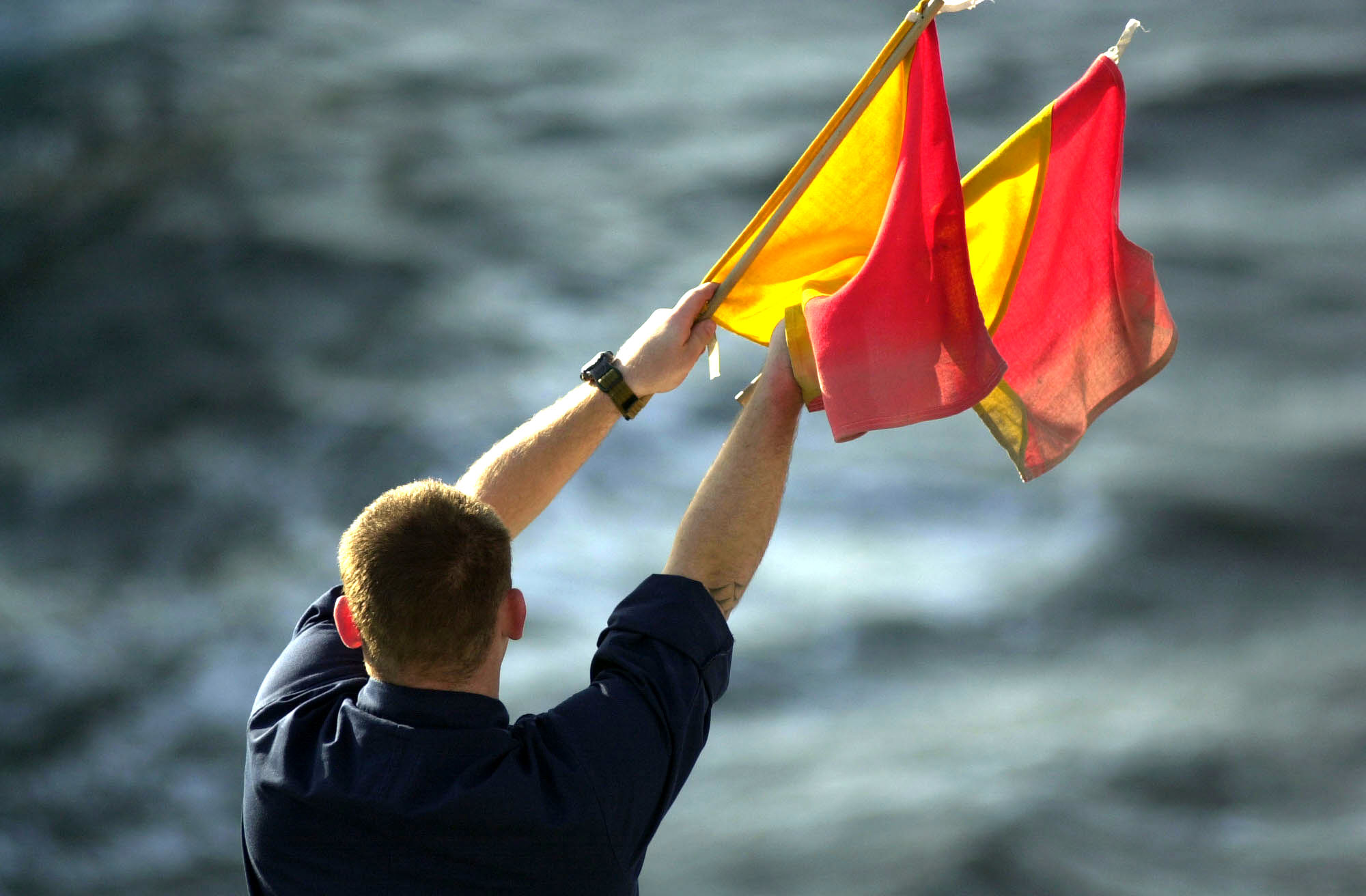
A naval signaler transmitting a message by flag semaphore (2002).

Semaphore flags are the system for conveying information at a distance by means of visual signals with hand-held flags, rods, disks, paddles, or occasionally bare or gloved hands. Information is encoded by the position of the flags, objects or arms; it is read when they are in a fixed position.

Semaphores were adopted and widely used (with hand-held flags replacing the mechanical arms of shutter semaphores) in the maritime world in the 19th century. They are still used during underway replenishment at sea and are acceptable for emergency communication in daylight or, using lighted wands instead of flags, at night.

The newer flag semaphore system uses two short poles with square flags, which a signaler holds in different positions to convey letters of the alphabet and numbers. The transmitter holds one pole in each hand, and extends each arm in one of eight possible directions. Except for in the rest position, the flags cannot overlap. The flags are colored differently based on whether the signals are sent by sea or by land. At sea, the flags are colored red and yellow (the Oscar flags), while on land, they are white and blue (the Papa flags). Flags are not required, they just make the characters more obvious.

=== Signal lamps ===
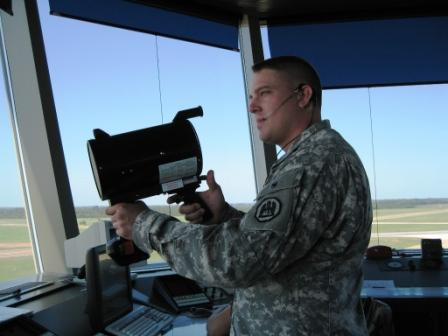
An air traffic controller holding a signal light gun that can be used to direct aircraft experiencing a radio failure (2007).

Signal lamps (such as Aldis lamps), are visual signaling devices for optical communication (typically using Morse code). Modern signal lamps are a focused lamp which can produce a pulse of light. In large versions this pulse is achieved by opening and closing shutters mounted in front of the lamp, either via a manually operated pressure switch or, in later versions, automatically.

With hand held lamps, a concave mirror is tilted by a trigger to focus the light into pulses. The lamps are usually equipped with some form of optical sight, and are most commonly deployed on naval vessels and also used in airport control towers with coded aviation light signals.

Aviation light signals are used in the case of a radio failure, an aircraft not equipped with a radio, or in the case of a hearing-impaired pilot. Air traffic controllers have long used signal light guns to direct such aircraft. The light gun's lamp has a focused bright beam capable of emitting three different colors: red, white and green. These colors may be flashing or steady, and provide different instructions to aircraft in flight or on the ground (for example, "cleared to land" or "cleared for takeoff"). Pilots can acknowledge the instructions by wiggling their plane's wings, moving their ailerons if they are on the ground, or by flashing their landing or navigation lights during night time. Only 12 simple standardized instructions are directed at aircraft using signal light guns as the system is not utilized with Morse code.

=== Heliograph ===
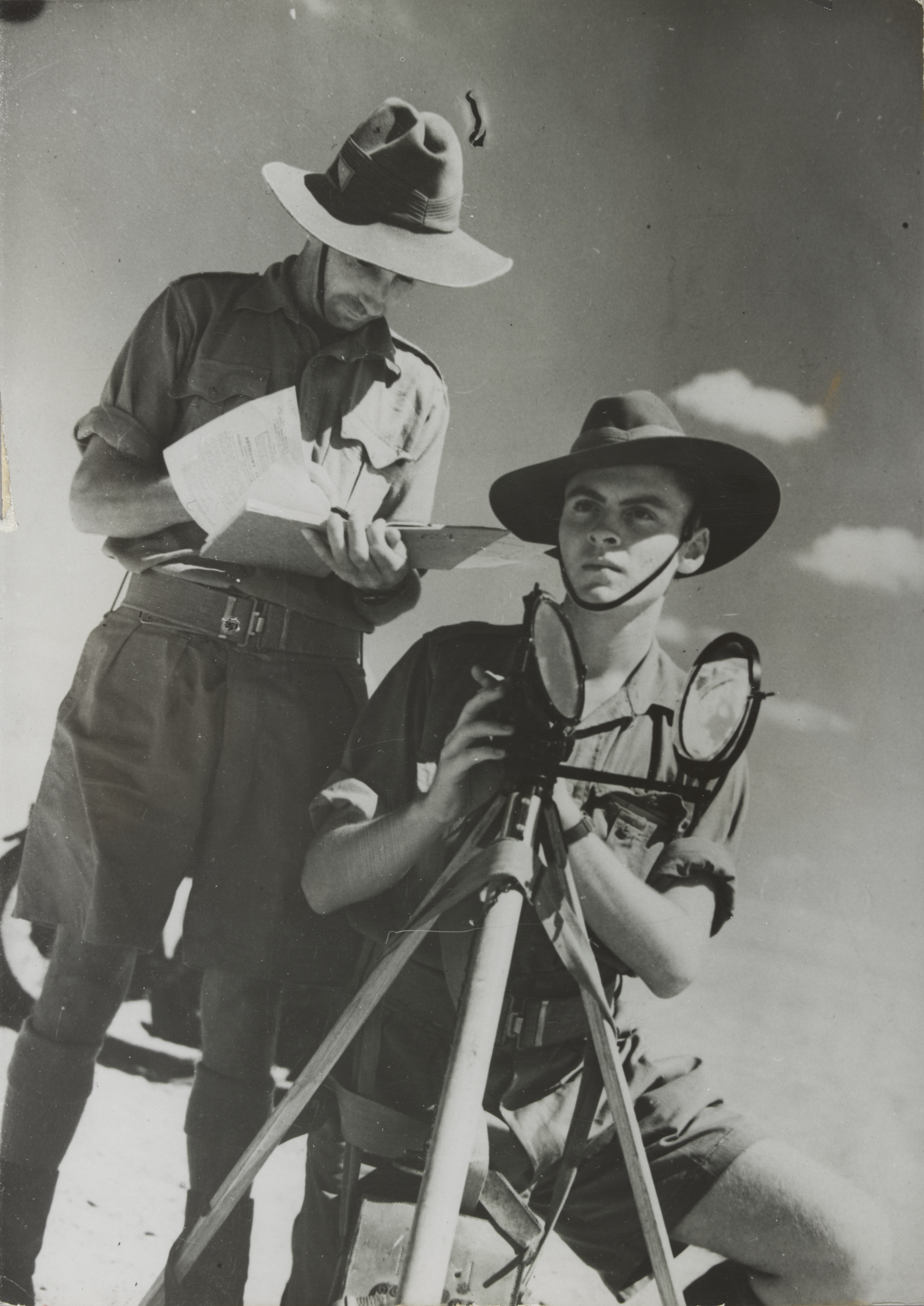
Heliograph: Australians using a heliograph in North Africa (1940).

A heliograph (Greek: Ἥλιος helios, meaning "sun", and γραφειν graphein, meaning "write") is a wireless solar telegraph that signals by flashes of sunlight (generally using Morse code) reflected by a mirror. The flashes are produced by momentarily pivoting the mirror, or by interrupting the beam with a shutter.

The heliograph was a simple but effective instrument for instantaneous optical communication over long distances during the late 19th and early 20th century. Its main uses were in military, surveys and forest protection work. They were standard issue in the British and Australian armies until the 1960s, and were used by the Pakistani army as late as 1975.

== Electronic forms ==
In the present day a variety of electronic systems optically transmit and receive information carried by pulses of light. Fiber-optic communication cables are employed to carry electronic data and telephone traffic. Free-space optical communications are also used every day in various applications.

=== Optical fiber ===
In 1964, the electrical engineer Charles Kuen Kao proposed developing broadband telecommunication systems based on optical fiber. He received the Nobel Prize in Physics in 2009 for his vision and his contributions to the development of optical communication systems. Optical fiber is now the most common type of channel for optical communications. The transmitters in optical fiber links are generally light-emitting diodes (LEDs) or laser diodes. Infrared light is used more commonly than visible light, because optical fibers transmit infrared wavelengths with less attenuation and dispersion. The signal encoding is typically simple intensity modulation, although historically optical phase and frequency modulation have been demonstrated in the lab. The need for periodic signal regeneration was largely superseded by the introduction of the erbium-doped fiber amplifier, which extended link distances at significantly lower cost. The commercial introduction of dense wavelength-division multiplexing (WDM) in 1996 by Ciena Corp was the real start of optical networking. WDM is now the common basis of nearly every high-capacity optical system in the world.

The first optical communication systems were designed and delivered to the U.S. Army and Chevron by Optelecom, Inc., the venture co-founded by Gordon Gould, the inventor of the optical amplifier and the laser.

While massive efforts were spent worldwide to mature optical silica fibers for telecommunication, Yasuhiro Koike decided to launch graded-index polymer optical fiber (GIPOF). The core diameter of GIPOF is much larger than those of silica fibers, facilitating easier handling and interconnections. GIPOF is suitable for high capacity short distance telecommunication systems and optical interconnects.

==== Optical routing ====
Fiberoptic telecommunications systems require switching centers to direct information from a transmitter to the appropriate receiver. Traditionally, this routing is performed using electronic components. Towards the end of the twentieth century, the idea emerged to implement these functions, either wholly or partially, using photonic technologies. A key concept in this context is the optical cross-connect. It enables optical signals to be switched and routed directly, without conversion into an electrical format. This facilitates faster and more energy-efficient networks.

=== Photophone ===
The photophone (originally given an alternate name, radiophone) is a communication device which allowed for the transmission of speech on a beam of light. It was invented jointly by Alexander Graham Bell and his assistant Charles Sumner Tainter on February 19, 1880, at Bell's 1325 'L' Street laboratory in Washington, D.C. Both were later to become full associates in the Volta Laboratory Association, created and financed by Bell.

On June 21, 1880, Bell's assistant transmitted a wireless voice telephone message of considerable distance, from the roof of the Franklin School to the window of Bell's laboratory, some 213 meters (about 700 ft) away.

Bell believed the photophone was his most important invention. Of the 18 patents granted in Bell's name alone, and the 12 he shared with his collaborators, four were for the photophone, which Bell referred to as his "greatest achievement", telling a reporter shortly before his death that the photophone was "the greatest invention [I have] ever made, greater than the telephone".

The photophone was a precursor to the fiber-optic communication systems which achieved popular worldwide usage starting in the 1980s. The master patent for the photophone (U.S. patent 235,199 Apparatus for Signalling and Communicating, called Photophone), was issued in December 1880, many decades before its principles came to have practical applications.

=== Free-space ===
Free-space optics (FSO) systems are employed for 'last mile' telecommunications and can function over distances of several kilometers as long as there is a clear line of sight between the source and the destination, and the optical receiver can reliably decode the transmitted information. Other free-space systems can provide high-data-rate, long-range links using small, low-mass, low-power-consumption subsystems which make them suitable for communications in space. Various planned satellite constellations intended to provide global broadband coverage take advantage of these benefits and employ laser communication for inter-satellite links between the several hundred to thousand satellites effectively creating a space-based optical mesh network.

More generally, transmission of unguided optical signals is known as optical wireless communications (OWC). Examples include medium-range visible light communication and short-distance IrDA, using infrared LEDs.

In the early 1960s, research into the use of laser light for free-space communication was conducted, notably by Bell Laboratories in the United States. A breakthrough failed to materialize because the connection was heavily affected by atmospheric turbulence, rain, and fog. With the advent of fiber-optic communication, research became limited to satellite communication. However, this topic is once again being researched as an alternative to fiber optics for distances of up to several kilometers. New techniques allow for better mitigation of turbulence-induced interference. The advantage is that establishing a connection requires no costly groundwork, enabling rapid deployment. A test environment has been set up between Eindhoven University of Technology (TU/e) and the High Tech Campus to investigate these new techniques. In 2026, TU/e set a world record with a 5 km link achieving a data rate of 7.73 terabits per second.

==== Mobile ====
Wi-Fi is commonly used for short-distance mobile connections. Optical connections can offer much greater bandwidth than radio connections, however. Li-Fi (Light Fidelity) is an optical wireless communication technology designed for short-distance communication, analogous to Wi-Fi. The challenge with Li-FI is ensuring the user does not lose the connection when the receiver moves behind an object that blocks the light. The system must automatically switch to another optical transceiver that still has a clear line of sight. Light-emitting diode sources are part of a network featuring an automatic tracking system. When narrow laser beams are used, they are controlled by an aiming system that ensures the beam remains aligned with the receiver. Communication must also be maintained as the user moves from room to room within a building.

Infrared light is typically used to control household devices. In addition to the television, smart systems can also control lighting, curtains, and door locks, for example.

== Societies, conferences, and awards ==
Most engineers and scientists active in the field are members of the IEEE Photonics Society (previously the IEEE Lasers and Electro-Optics Society) and Optica (previously the Optical Society of America). Major conferences are the Optical Fiber Conference (OFC) and the European Conference on Optical Communication (ECOC). The OptoElectronics and Communications Conference (OECC) is an annual optical communications conference that is held in the Asia-Pacific region. The International Cooperative of Plastic Optical Fibers (ICPOF) is the authorized organisation that overseas and guides the premier global series of the International Conference on Plastic Optical Fibers (POF).

The most prestigious award in the field of optical communication and photonics is the John Tyndall Award.

== See also ==
- Fiber tapping
- Interconnect bottleneck
- Jun-Ichi Nishizawa an inventor of optical communication
- Modulating retro-reflector
- Opto-isolator
- Parallel optical interface
