= Optical interconnect =

Light-based signal transmission systems

In integrated circuits, an optical interconnect is a system that transmits signals from one part of the circuit to another using light.

== Integrated circuits ==
In integrated circuits(IC) or between IC dies, optical interconnects have been the topic of study due to the high latency and power consumption incurred by conventional metal interconnects in transmitting electrical signals in interconnects classed as global interconnects, where distances can exceed 1cm. The International Technology Roadmap for Semiconductors (ITRS) has highlighted interconnect scaling as a problem for the semiconductor industry.

In conventional copper wire electrical interconnects, transmitted nonlinear signals (e.g. digital signals) encounter resistance and capacitance which severely limits the rise time of signals when the dimension of the wires are scaled down and bits of information overlap when frequency is increased.

In order to control the optical signals inside the small IC package properly, microelectromechanical system (MEMS) technology can be used to integrate the optical components (i.e. optical waveguides, optical fibers, lens, mirrors, optical actuators, optical sensors etc.) and the electronic parts together effectively.

== Benefits of using optical interconnection ==
When compared to metal wires, optical interconnections can provide benefits:

1. More predictable timing
2. Reduction of power and area for clock distribution
3. Distance independence of performance of optical interconnects
4. No frequency-dependent Cross-talk
5. Architectural advantages
6. Reducing power dissipation in interconnects
7. Voltage isolation
8. Density of interconnects
9. Reducing the wiring layers
10. Chips could be tested in a non-contact optical test set
11. Benefits of short optical pulses

== Challenges for optical interconnect ==
However, when implementing dense optical interconnects, there can be many technical challenges:

1. Receiver circuits and low-capacitance integration of photodetectors
2. Evolutionary improvement in optoelectronic devices
3. Absence of appropriate practical optomechanical technology
4. Integration technologies
5. Polarization control
6. Temperature dependencies and process variation
7. Losses and errors
8. Testability
9. Packaging

== See also ==
- Organic light-emitting transistor
- Silicon photonics
