= Pioneer Award in Nanotechnology =

IEEE award

- Awarded for: Individuals who by virtue of initiating new areas of research, development or engineering have had a significant impact on the field of nanotechnology.
- Country: United States
- Presented by: Institute of Electrical and Electronics Engineers
- Website: IEEE Nanotechnology Council

The IEEE Pioneer Award in Nanotechnology is given by the Institute of Electrical and Electronics Engineers Nanotechnology Council for research in nanotechnology.

The main considerations for judging include distinction in long-term technical achievements, leadership, innovation, breadth, and impact on nanotechnology and engineering, recognizing individuals whose technical achievements go beyond the borders of a particular technical society. Nominees must be at least ten years beyond their terminal degree. One or two Pioneer Awards are given each year; when two are awarded, there may be one for academics, and one for industry or government. The award consists of honorarium and a commemorative plaque.

== Recipients ==
Year		Awardee	Institution	Scope of work
2007		Mark Reed	Yale University	Molecular scale electronics
2007		Pallab Bhattacharya	University of Michigan	Quantum dot optoelectronic devices
2008		Sajeev John	University of Toronto	Photonic crystals
2009		Susumu Noda	Kyoto University	Photonic crystals and nanophotonics
2010		Phaedon Avouris	IBM T.J. Watson Research Center	Carbon-based electronics and photonics
2011		Alexander A. Balandin	University of California, Riverside	Nanoscale phonon transport
2011		Meyya Meyyappan	NASA Ames Research Center	Carbon nanotubes
2012		Joseph W. Lyding	University of Illinois at Urbana–Champaign	Nanofabrication and CMOS giant deuterium isotope effect
2013	2013 awardee Charles M. Lieber	Charles M. Lieber	Harvard University	Nanowire synthesis and applications
2014		Stephen Y. Chou	Princeton University	Nanoimprint lithography and nanodevices
2015		Chennupati Jagadish	Australian National University	Semiconductor nanowire and quantum dot optoelectronics
2016	Shawn-Yu Lin	Shawn-Yu Lin	Rensselaer Polytechnic Institute	3D optical photonic crystals
2017		Paras N. Prasad	State University of New York at Buffalo	Multifunctional nanoprobes and nanophotonics for biomedical technology
2018		Nader Engheta	University of Pennsylvania	Photonic metamaterials and optical nanocircuits
2019		Paul Weiss	University of California	Ultimate limits of miniaturization and function
2020		Supriyo Bandyopadhyay	Virginia Commonwealth University	Spintronics and Straintronics Nanostructures

== See also ==
- Kavli Prize in Nanoscience
- Foresight Institute Feynman Prize in Nanotechnology
- ISNSCE Nanoscience Award
