= High contrast grating =

In physics, a high contrast grating is a single layer near-wavelength grating physical structure where the grating material has a large contrast in index of refraction with its surroundings. The term near-wavelength refers to the grating period, which has a value between one optical wavelength in the grating material and that in its surrounding materials.

The high contrast gratings have many distinct attributes that are not found in conventional gratings. These features include broadband ultra-high reflectivity, broadband ultra-high transmission, and very high quality factor resonance, for optical beam surface-normal or in oblique incidence to the grating surface. The high reflectivity grating can be ultrathin, only <0.15 optical wavelength. The reflection and transmission phase of the optical beam through the high contrast grating can be engineered to cover a full 2π range while maintaining a high reflection or transmission coefficient.

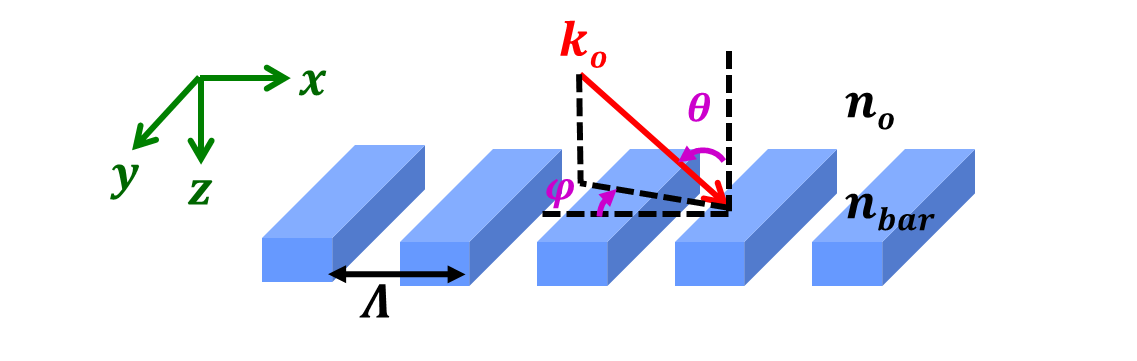
Schematics of high contrast grating. Λ, grating period; k_{o}, incident light wave vector; n_{bar}, refractive index of grating bar; n_{o}, refractive index of the surrounding medium of the grating bar.

== History ==
The concept of high contrast grating took off with a report on a broadband high reflectivity reflector for surface-normal incident light (the ratio between the wavelength bandwidth with a reflectivity larger than 0.99 and the central wavelength is greater than 30%) in 2004 by Constance J. Chang-Hasnain et al., which was demonstrated experimentally in the same year. The key idea is to have the high-refractive-index material all surrounded by low-refractive-index material. They are subsequently applied as a highly reflective mirror in vertical-cavity surface-emitting lasers, as well as monolithic, continuously wavelength tunable vertical-cavity surface-emitting lasers. The properties of high contrast grating are rapidly explored since then. The following lists some relevant examples:

In 2008, a single layer of high contrast grating was demonstrated as a high quality factor cavity. In 2009, hollow-core waveguides using high contrast grating were proposed, followed by experimentally demonstration in 2012. This experiment is the first demonstration to show a high contrast grating reflecting optical beam propagating in the direction parallel to the gratings, which is a major distinction from photonic crystal or distributed Bragg reflector.

In 2010, planar, single-layer lenses and focusing reflectors with high focusing power using a high contrast grating with spatially varying grating dimensions were proposed and demonstrated. Some literatures quote the high contrast gratings as photonic crystal slabs or photonic crystal membranes.

== Principle of operation ==
Fully rigorous electromagnetic solutions exist for gratings, which tends to involve heavy mathematical formulism. A simple analytical formulism to explain the various properties of high contrast grating has been developed. A computational program based on this analytical solution has also been developed to solve the electromagnetic properties of high contrast grating, named High Contrast Grating Solver. The following provides a brief overview of the operation principle of high contrast grating.

The grating bars can be considered as merely a periodic array of waveguides with wave being guided along the grating thickness direction. Upon plane wave incidence, depending on wavelength and grating dimensions, only a few waveguide-array modes are excited. Due to a large index contrast and near-wavelength dimensions, there exists a wide wavelength range where only two waveguide-array modes have real propagation constants in the z direction and, hence, carry energy. The two waveguide-array modes then depart from the grating input plane and propagate downward to the grating exiting plane, and then reflect back up. After propagating through the grating thickness, each propagating mode accumulates a different phase. At the exiting plane, owing to a strong mismatch with the exiting plane wave, the waveguide modes not only reflect back to themselves but also couple into each other. As the modes propagate and return to the input plane, similar mode coupling occurs. Following the modes through one round trip, the reflectivity solution can be attained. The two modes interfere at the input and exiting plane of the high contrast grating, leading to various distinct properties.

== Applications ==
High contrast gratings have been employed in many optoelectronic devices. It has been incorporated as the mirrors for vertical-cavity surface-emitting lasers. The light-weight of high contrast grating enables fast microelectromechanical structure actuation for wavelength tuning. The reflection phase of the high contrast grating is engineered to control the emission wavelength of vertical-cavity surface-emitting lasers. By locally changing each grating dimension while keeping its thickness the same, planar, single-layer lenses and focusing reflectors with high focusing power have been obtained. Besides its high reflectivity, the high contrast grating has been designed as a high quality factor resonator. Low-loss hollow-core waveguide are made with high contrast gratings with high reflectivity at oblique incident angle. Applications such as slow light and optical switch can be built on the hollow-core waveguide by using the special phase response and resonance property of high contrast grating. High contrast grating can effectively manipulate the light propagation – directing light from surface-normal to in-plane index-guided waveguide and vice versa.
