= Mode scrambler =

Telecommunications device for handling signals on optical fiber

In telecommunications, a mode scrambler or mode mixer is a device for inducing mode coupling in an optical fiber, or a device that, itself, exhibits a uniform output intensity profile independent of the input mode volume or modal excitation condition. Mode scramblers are used to provide a modal distribution that is independent of the optical source for purposes of laboratory, manufacturing, or field measurements or tests. Mode scramblers are primarily used to improve reproducibility of multimode fiber bandwidth measurements.

== Overview ==
If multimode fiber bandwidth is measured using a laser diode directly coupled to its input, the resulting measurement can vary by as much as an order of magnitude. This measurement variability is due to the combination of differences in laser output characteristics (emitted mode power distribution) and the differential mode delay of the fiber. Differential mode delay is the difference in the time delays amongst the fiber's propagating modes caused by imperfections or nonideality of the fiber refractive index profile.

The primary purpose of a mode scrambler is to create a uniform, overfilled launch condition that can be easily reproduced on multiple measurement systems, so that measurement systems have essentially the same launch conditions and can measure approximately the same bandwidth despite having different laser sources. These were used for this purpose in the first U.S. NIST round-robins on multimode fiber. The overfilled launch (OFL) was created to reduce measurement variability, and improve concatenation estimates for multimode fibers, used at that time for telecom 'long haul' (e.g., 7–10 km 850 nm or 20–30 km 1300 nm) systems.

When the telecom industry converted to near-exclusive use of single-mode fiber ca. 1984, multimode fiber was re-purposed for use in LANs, such as Fiber Distributed Data Interface (FDDI), then under development. The output modal power distribution of a mode scrambler is similar to the surface-emitters used in those first LAN transmitters, but this was fortuitous coincidence. On average, but not in every case, the OFL bandwidth measured using a mode scrambler is lower than that produced by excitation of a partial mode volume (restricted mode launch or RML), such as occurs with directly coupled laser diodes.

== Types ==
There are two common types of mode scramblers: the "Step-Graded-Step" (S-G-S) and the "step index with bends". The S-G-S mode scrambler is actually an assembly, a fusion-spliced concatenation of a step-index profile, a graded-index profile and another step-index profile fiber. Typically, each segment is approximately 1 meter long, and may use segments of unconventional size to produce the distribution required according to core size of fiber to be tested. Unconventional fiber size was not an issue, as they were developed by fiber manufacturers, but some test equipment has difficulty complying with revised qualification standards, and now use "Step Index with Bends" mode scramblers, which can be adjusted to purpose. Step Index with Bend mode scramblers are created simply by routing a specially designed step-index multimode fiber through a series of small radius bends, or by compressing fiber against surfaces with specific roughness. The implementations are simple, but generally less reproducible, and require care to avoid over-stressing the fiber.

A mode scrambler can be characterized and qualified by measuring its near-field and far-field distributions, as well as by measuring one of these distributions while restricting the other. Guidelines for constructing a mode scrambler and qualifying its output can be found in the ANSI/TIA/EIA-455-54 fiber optic test procedure (FOTP).

== See also ==
- Equilibrium mode distribution
- Mandrel wrapping
