= Nanophotonic scintillators =

High-energy detection

Nanophotonic scintillators are scintillating materials or structures which possess improved properties due to the manipulation of the scintillated visible light using nanophotonics.

The most common approach for using nanophotonics to improve the scintillated signal is to coat the thick bulk scintillator by a thin film (usually a 2D photonic crystal) that reduce the total internal reflected light and thus improve the amount of signal that is transmitted towards the photodetector. Thus, the coating improve the quantum yield of the scintillator, that is, the amount of visible photons that get extracted from the scintillator as a result of a single quanta of high-energy excitation. This approach can be beneficial for all scintillation applications (for example, medical imaging devices as PET-CT, airport security machines, and free-electron cameras). The best performance of this approach recently showed a 10-fold enhancement in the quantum yield in a micro-CT experiment.

Another, more recent approach, attempts to utilize the control over the intrinsic scintillation process of spontaneous emission to improve scintillation. This approach is based on the Purcell effect to enhance the spontaneous emission by manipulating the local photonic density of states. That is, instead of having an isotropic emission of light due to a high-energy radiation that reaches the scintillator, the emission itself is directional towards the location of the detector through a reduction of the emission into directions which experience total internal reflection between the scintillator and its surrounding materials (usually air). Experimental signatures of such enhancements have been reported in a cathodoluminescence experiment. The fabrication of nanophotonic scintillators also can be easier and low-cost in solution-processable perovskite (structure) scintillators as they can be patterned through nanoimprinting lithography while some perovskite materials with high refractive index already demonstrated strong Purcell effect and spontaneous emission inhibition.
