= Cutback =

Cutback or Cutbacks may refer to:

- Cutback technique, a destructive technique for determining certain optical fiber transmission characteristics
- Cutback (surfing move)
- Cutback (roller coaster), a roller coaster inversion similar to a corkscrew
- Cutback (football move), a sudden change in direction by a ball carrier in American football
- "Cutbacks" (30 Rock), an episode of 30 Rock

== See also ==
- Austerity, or budget cutbacks
