= Michael Hochberg =

American physicist (born 1980)

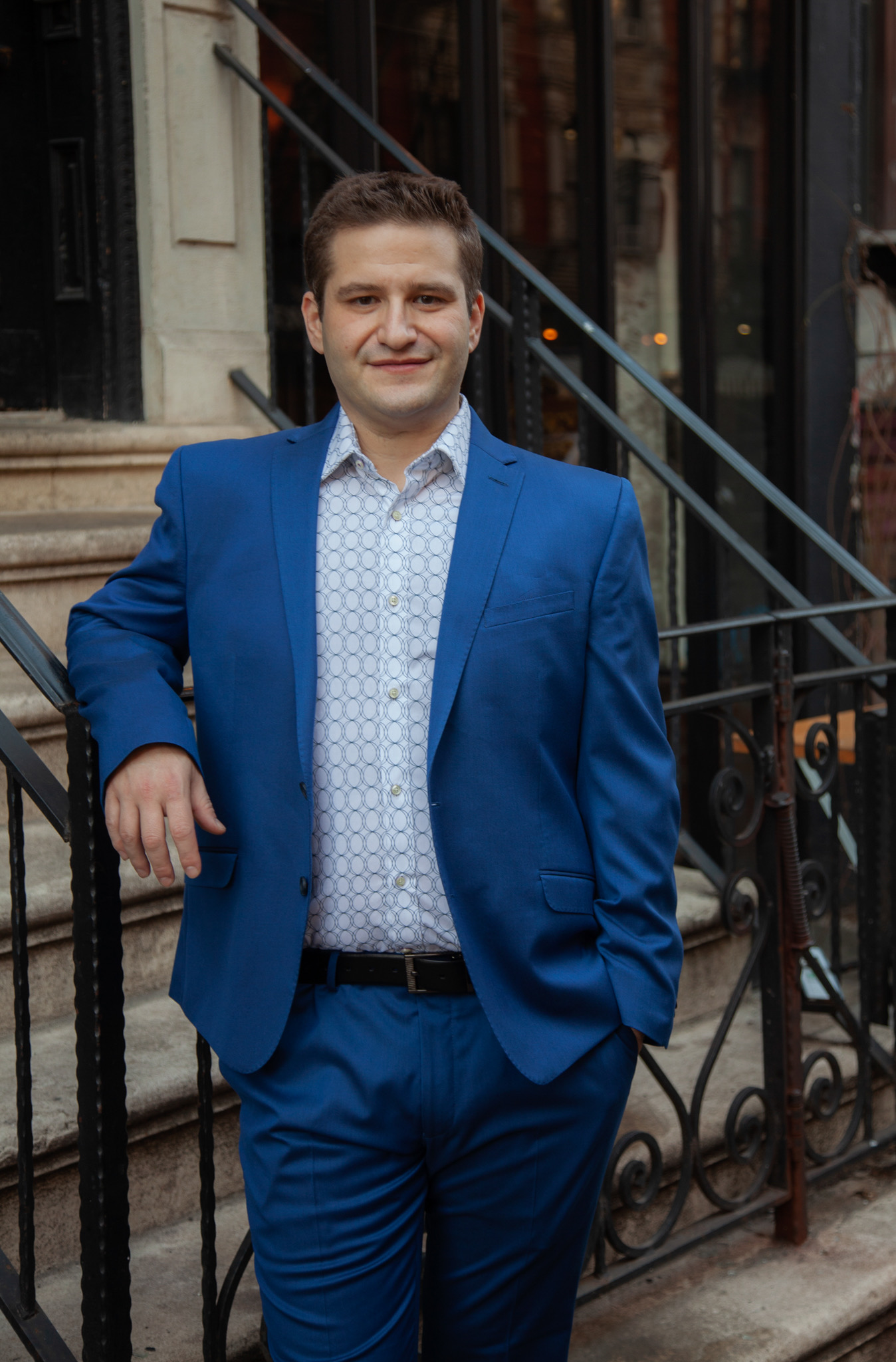
Michael Hochberg

Michael Hochberg (born 1980) is an American physicist. Hochberg's research includes silicon photonics and large-scale photonic integration. Much of his work in silicon photonics has been the product of collaborations with Thomas Baehr-Jones.

== Degrees ==
He obtained a BS in physics in 2002, an MS in applied physics in 2005 and a PhD in applied physics in 2006, all from the California Institute of Technology. Hochberg was a student of Professor Axel Scherer.

== Awards and recognition ==
In 2014, he was selected as a member of the Technology Review TR 35 Asia

He won a Singapore NRF Fellowship in 2013.

In 2010, he was a National Academy of Sciences Kavli Fellow.

He won a Presidential Early Career Award in Science and Engineering in 2009 through the U.S. Department of Defense.

Hochberg was awarded the Air Force Office of Scientific Research Young Investigator award in 2007.

On graduation from his PHD program in 2006, he won the Demetriades-Tsafka Prize for the best thesis in nanotechnology.

In 2002, he was awarded an National Science Foundation Graduate Research Fellowship.

== Companies founded ==
Hochberg has been a founder at four companies. In each case his long-time collaborator Tom Baehr-Jones was one of the co-founders.

Simulant, which the first company to produce a distributed-memory implementation of finite difference time domain electromagnetic simulation tools. Simulant was acquired as part of the founding of Luxtera.

Luxtera, which was founded later in his undergraduate career, pioneered building silicon integrated optics in a CMOS foundry. Acquired by Cisco.

Silicon Lightwave Services. The first stand-alone integrated photonics design services company. Acquired by Marlin Investments.

Elenion (formerly known as Coriant Advanced Technologies). A pioneer in building silicon photonic systems-on-chip, including coherent and data-center transceivers at speeds from 100G to 400G. Acquired by Nokia.

== Corporate Experience ==
After Elenion was acquired by Nokia, Hochberg joined Nokia as CTO for Optical Subsystems from April 2020 to July 2021.

Hochberg left Nokia to join Luminous Computing serving as President of the startup then operating in Stealth mode. After announcing its Series A funding in March 2022, the company publicly announced that Hochberg had already joined as president and would be running Engineering and Operations.

== Academic positions ==
He was an associate professor of electrical and computer engineering, materials science and chemical and biomolecular engineering at the University of Delaware in 2012-2014.

He held a professorship in electrical and computer engineering National University of Singapore during 2012-2014.

He held a position as assistant professor in electrical engineering at the University of Washington from 2007 to 2012. and as an adjunct in physics for part of this period.

He was also the founding director of OpSIS: A US-based non-profit institute which pioneered the use of PDK’s and shared MPW runs for silicon photonics, with backing from the Air Force, Intel, Mentor Graphics, and several others. The OPSIS organization shut down in 2014 after its 5-year core funding expired.

== Book ==
He and Lukas Chrostowski co-authored a book called Silicon Photonics Design: From Devices to Systems which has become a widely used text for courses in the field.

== Research interests and selected works ==
The overall theme of Hochberg’s work has focused on scaling complexity and integrating new functionality into silicon photonic platforms. He has contributed to a number of areas within the broader field of silicon photonics, including:

- Platform integration, fabless infrastructure and PDK Development
  - An overview of some of his team's early work on PDK's
  - Towards Fabless Silicon Photonics An article predicting growth to a multibillion-dollar industry by 2020, published in 2010, and showing exponential growth in the complexity of silicon photonic circuits over time
  - Myths and Rumours of Silicon Photonics An article debunking a number of popular misconceptions about the field.
  - Silicon Photonics: The next fabless semiconductor industry A review of the current state of fabless silicon photonics in 2013.
- Hybrid integration of organic materials with silicon waveguides, including the first demonstrations that slot waveguides could be integrated with electrooptic polymers to produce exceptionally low drive voltage modulators
- Quantum Optics in Silicon
- Artificial intelligence and deep learning
  - This work resulted in the creation of two startup companies, Lightmatter and Lightelligence, both spinoffs of Dirk Englund’s group at MIT
- Label-free Biosensor Arrays in silicon began as a collaboration with Genalyte
- Lasers and laser integration in silicon
- Nonlinear optics in silicon
- Mid-infrared waveguides and resonators in silicon
- High-Q ring resonators in silicon
- Inverse design and computationally automated optimization
- Active and high-speed photonic-electronic devices, including modulators and photodetectors
- Photonic-electronic integration and transceivers
- Optical Switching
- Optical actuation and force sensing
