= Substitution method (optical fiber) =

In optical fiber technology, the substitution method is a method of measuring the transmission loss of a fiber. It consists of:

1. using a stable optical source, at the wavelength of interest, to drive a mode scrambler, the output of which overfills (drives) a 1 to 2 meter long reference fiber having physical and optical characteristics matching those of the fiber under test,
2. measuring the power level at the output of the reference fiber,
3. repeating the procedure, substituting the fiber under test for the reference fiber, and
4. subtracting the power level obtained at the output of the fiber under test from the power level obtained at the output of the reference fiber, to get the transmission loss of the fiber under test.

The substitution method has certain shortcomings with regard to its accuracy, but its simplicity makes it a popular field test method. It is conservative, in that if it were used to measure the individual losses of several long fibers, and the long fibers were concatenated, the total loss obtained (excluding splice losses) would be expected to be lower than the sum of the individual fiber losses.

Some modern optical power meters have the capability to set to zero the reference level measured at the output of the reference fiber, so that the transmission loss of the fiber under test may be read out directly.

== See also ==
- Cutback technique
