= Berciu =

Berciu is a Romanian surname. Notable people with the surname include:

- Dumitru Berciu (1907–1998), Romanian historian and archaeologist
- Ion Berciu (born 1940), Romanian politician
- Lucia Berciu (1916–2011), Romanian linguist
- Mona Berciu, Romanian-Canadian physicist
