= Luxtera =

Luxtera Inc.
- Type: Subsidiary of Cisco Systems
- Industry: Semiconductors
- Founded: 2001; 25 years ago
- Founder: Axel Scherer; Michael Hochberg; Tom Baehr-Jones; Eli Yablonovitch
- Headquarters: Carlsbad, California
- Products: Blazar
- Parent: Cisco Systems
- Website: www.luxtera.com

Luxtera Inc., a subsidiary of Cisco Systems, is a semiconductor company that uses silicon photonics technology to build complex electro-optical systems in a production silicon CMOS process.

The company uses fabless manufacturing; it uses semiconductor fabrication plants of Freescale Semiconductor.

The company received $130 million in funding and was acquired by Cisco Systems in 2019 for $660 million.

== History ==
The company was founded in 2001 by a group of professors and students at California Institute of Technology including Axel Scherer, Michael Hochberg, Tom Baehr-Jones, Eli Yablonovitch, Alex Dickinson, and Lawrence C Gunn.

In 2006, the company received a $5 million contract from the Defense Advanced Research Projects Agency.

In August 2007, the company introduced Blazar, a 40GB optical active cable for interconnect within high performance computer clusters using single-mode optical fiber.

In 2010, Luxtera was selected as one of MIT Technology Review's 50 Most Innovative Companies.

In February 2019, the company was acquired by Cisco Systems.

== Products ==
Luxtera sold embedded optical transceiver that were aimed at use in data centers, within telecom networks or companies, with the last transceiver using the QSFP 100G PSM4 specification. The company's cables used silicon photonics technology to send photonic data from their cables directly to semiconductors without first converting the data into electrical signals.
