= Yablonovite =

Yablonovite is a photonic crystal structure that has an inverse cylindrical holes arranged in a diamond lattice. It was the first 3D photonic crystal to be fabricated with a complete photonic bandgap. It was created in 1991 by Eli Yablonovitch and his team.

The structure that Yablonovitch was able to produce involved drilling a triangular array of cylindrical holes in layers of transparent material, where the holes of each layer are placed on top of the remaining material in the layer below, the structure repeats every 4 layers, and was modeled after an inverse diamond structure.
