= Constance J. Chang-Hasnain =

American electrical engineer

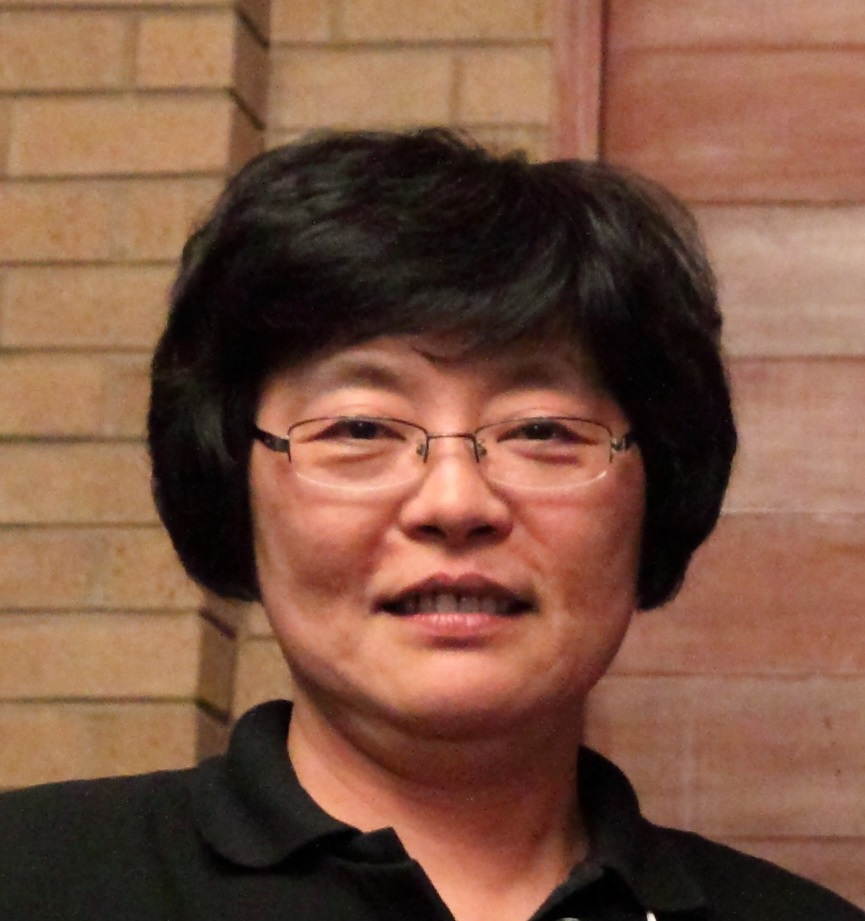
- Education: University of California, Davis (BS); University of California, Berkeley (MS, PhD)
- Known for: VCSEL; High contrast grating and metastructures; Slow light
- Scientific career
- Fields: Electrical engineering
- Workplaces: Stanford University; University of California, Berkeley
- Doctoral advisor: John Roy Whinnery

Constance J. Chang-Hasnain is a Taiwanese-American electrical engineer who is the chairperson and founder of Berxel Photonics Co. Ltd. and Whinnery Professor Emerita of the University of California, Berkeley. She was President of Optica in 2021.

== Education ==
She obtained a B.S. degree in electrical and computer engineering from University of California, Davis in 1982, an M.S. and a Ph.D. in electrical engineering and computer science from the University of California, Berkeley in 1984 and 1987, respectively.

== Career ==
She was a member of technical staff at Bellcore from 1987 to 1992 and assistant professor at Stanford University between 1992 and 1995. She joined the University of California Berkeley as professor of electrical engineering and computer sciences in 1996. She was Whinnery Distinguished Chair Professor 2006–2020; chair of the Nanoscale Science and Engineering Graduate Group 2006–2017; and associate dean for strategic alliances of College of Engineering 2014–2019. She was the founding co-director of Tsinghua-Berkeley Shenzhen Institute (TBSI) 2015–2020 and the chief academic officer of Berkeley Education Alliance for Research in Singapore (BEARS) 2015–2018.

Chang-Hasnain was president of Optica in 2021, and has been an Optica member since graduate school. She has been an active volunteer and held several leadership positions in the society. She served as associate editor of the IEEE Journal of Lightwave Technologies from 2005 to 2006, and editor-in-chief from 2007 to 2012. She was elected director-at-large of the board of directors from 1998 to 2000 and served on Optica's Centennial Advisory Panel from 2014 to 2016. She was elected as Optica's vice president in 2019.

She served as CLEO program co-chair in 1997 and general co-chair in 1999, OSA Slow and Fast Light Topical Meeting program co-chair in 2006 and general co-chair in 2007, and OSA Frontiers in Optics Conference general co-chair in 2007. She was the general technical co-chair in 2004 and general co-chair for the Asia Pacific Optical Communications Conference in 2005.

Chang-Hasnain was elected a member of the National Academy of Engineering in 2018 for contributions to wavelength tunable diode lasers and multiwavelength laser arrays.

She is a Fellow of the IEEE, The Optical Society, and the Institution of Engineering and Technology.

Her research interests include VCSELs, high contrast gratings, and nanostructure growth. In 2024, she received the IEEE Nick Holonyak Jr. Medal for pioneering contributions to vertical-cavity surface-emitting laser (VCSEL) and VCSEL-based photonics for optical communications and sensing. She was awarded with the 2022 Welker Award for her contributions to vertical cavity surface emitting laser (VCSEL) photonics, nano-photonics and high contrast metastructures for optical communications and optical sensing. She also received the Okawa Prize in 2018 for pioneering and outstanding research of VCSEL photonics through the development of their novel functions for optical communications and optical sensing.

She joined the Chinese University of Hong Kong, Shenzhen in 2023 and currently serves as the X.Q. Deng Presidential Chair Professor at the School of Science and Engineering of CUHKSZ.

== Awards ==
- IEEE LEOS Distinguished Lecturer Award, 1994
- Curtis W. McGraw Research Award from the American Society of Engineering Education, 2000
- IEEE William Streifer Scientific Achievement Award, 2003
- National Academy of Engineering, Gilbreth Lecturer Award, 2005
- Nick Holonyak Jr. Award, Optical Society of America, 2007
  - For contributions to the control of diode lasers: vertical cavity surface emitting laser arrays, injection locking and slow light
- Guggenheim Fellow, 2009
- Humboldt Research Award, Alexander von Humboldt Stiftung Foundation, 2009
- Vannevar Bush Faculty Fellowship (formerly National Security Science and Engineering Faculty Fellowship), 2008
- IEEE David Sarnoff Award, 2011
- UNESCO Medal For the Development of Nanoscience and Nanotechnologies, 2015
- Elected Member, National Academy of Engineering, 2018
- The Okawa Prize, 2018
- The Welker Award, 2022
- The IEEE Nick Holonyak Jr. Medal Award, 2024
