= Axel Scherer =

Axel Scherer is the Bernard Neches Professor of Electrical Engineering, Physics, and Applied Physics at the California Institute of Technology. He is also a distinguished visiting professor at Thayer School of Engineering at Dartmouth College. He is known for fabricating the world's first semiconducting vertical-cavity surface-emitting laser (VCSEL) at Bell Labs. In 2006, Scherer was named the director of the Kavli Nanoscience Institute. He graduated from the New Mexico Institute of Mining and Technology in 1985. At Caltech, he teaches a very popular freshman lab course on semiconductor device fabrication, Applied Physics 9ab, for which he wrote the textbook.

== Research ==
His research focuses on the design and microfabrication of optical, magnetic and fluidic devices. In the 1980s, he pioneered the development of the first monolithic vertical cavity lasers (VCSELs), now widely used in data communications systems. More recently, his group developed electromagnetic design tools and fabrication techniques for the definition of lithographically integrated optical devices. This led to pioneering work in photonic bandgap lasers, silicon photonic circuits, as well as tunable microfluidic dye lasers, leading to new classes of integrated optics. The first demonstration of strong coupling between single quantum dots and optical nanocavities recently emerged from a collaboration between Axel Scherer and Hyatt Gibbs. Collaborations with Larry Dalton (University of Washington) resulted in some of the world's smallest and fastest light modulators.

Scherer also fabricated some of the first surface plasmon enhanced high brightness light emitting diodes. His group miniaturized fluidic systems and demonstrated the first multi-layer replication molded fluidic chips, with thousands of valves creating microfluidic “laboratories” and single cell analysis systems. Schere leads a group focused on the miniaturization and integration of fluidic, optical, electronic and magnetic devices for applications in biotechnology.

Scherer has co-authored over 300 publications and holds over 50 patents on the area of microfabrication and design of devices.

== Other professional work ==
He is co-founder and an advisor to Luxtera, a California manufacturer of photonics devices, Helixis, a California manufacturer of molecular diagnostic devices that was acquired by Illumina in 2010, and ChromaCode, a California manufacturer of molecular diagnostic reagents.

Scherer is a fellow of the National Academy of Inventors.
