= Vasily Astratov =

Russian physicist, academic, researcher

- Education: Saint Petersburg State University; Ioffe Institute
- Scientific career
- Fields: Photonics
- Workplaces: University of Sheffield; University of North Carolina at Charlotte
- Website: physics.uncc.edu/vasily-astratov

Vasily Astratov is a full professor of Physics and Optical Science at the University of North Carolina at Charlotte. He became known for launching synthetic opals as new self-assembled photonic crystals for visible light in 1995 in his former group at Ioffe Institute in Russia (jointly with Yurii Vlasov, Alexander Kaplyanskii and co-authors). This work has resulted in a quest for inverse opals with a complete three-dimensional photonic band gap.

== Early life ==
He received his M.S. from the Saint Petersburg State University, Russia, in 1981, and received his Ph.D. degree from the A.F. Ioffe Physical-Technical Institute, St. Petersburg, in 1986. At this institution he had accomplished a career as a research scientist, rising through the ranks from staff member (1981–1992), group leader (1992–1997), to senior member of staff in 1997. In 1997–2001 he worked as a postdoctoral scholar at the University of Sheffield where he developed novel surface coupling techniques for studying photonic crystal waveguides and semiconductor microcavities.

== Research ==
Prof. V. N. Astratov joined UNC-Charlotte in 2002. His current research is devoted to microspherical photonics including applications of photonic nanojets, coupled-cavity arrays and waveguides resonant light pressure effects and super-resolution microscopy. He was a topical editor for the journal Optics Express in 2005–2011 and an editor and co-editor for two Focus Issues of this journal. He has served as a technical committee member for major international conferences including CLEO 2006–07 and 2012–14, IEEE Photonics 2014–17, Photonics West 2017, ICTON 2009–17, and OECC/ACOFT 2008 and 2014. He co-/authored 15 patents in the US and Russia, and about 180 research publications which eventually brought him an h-index of 44.

== Research contributions ==
- Jason Franchak, MS, 2004; Current – Orthodox Priest, Holy Trinity Church, St. Basil Church Diocese of Eastern Pennsylvania. Jason did his MS in Physics and was integral in establishing the lab. His research, under the guidance of Dr. Astratov on optical transportation in chains of microresonators is considered as one of the early papers in the field.
- Dr. Andrey Kanaev, Postdoc, 2005; Current – Staff Member, Naval Research Laboratory. Primarily a theoretical scientist, Andrey explored optical coupling between un-even and size dependent resonators.
- Dr. Andrey Kapitonov, Postdoc, 2007; Current – in Belarus.
- Shashaanka Ashili, PhD, 2007; Current – Founder, Smart Drivinc, CEO of CureScience. Along with Jason, Shashaanka was integral in establishing the lab and further improving the understanding of optical transport and coupling within meso and micro structures.
- Dr. Kirankumar Hiremath, Postdoc; 2008; Current – Assistant Professor, Indian Institute of Technology, Jodhpur, India.
- Seungmoo Yang, PhD, 2009; Current – Postdoc, Vollmer lab.
- Dr. Oleksiy Svitelskiy, Postdoc, 2011; Current – Associate Professor, Gordon College.
- Arash Darafsheh, PhD, 2013; Current – Assistant Professor of radiation oncology at Washington University School of Medicine at St. Louis
- Kenneth W. Allen, PhD, 2014; Current – Chief Engineer of the Electromagnetics Division, Georgia Tech Research Institute, Advanced Concepts Laboratory.
- Yangcheng Li, PhD, 2015; Current – Staff Engineer, Western Digital.
- Farzaneh Abolmaali, PhD, 2018; Current – Research Scientist, Synrad.

== Awards ==
He is a recipient of a number of awards including International Visitor Award in France by Triangle de la Physique in 2011, Senior Visiting EPSRC Fellow Award in the UK in 2006, Award of the Exchange Program adopted between Royal Society and Russian Academy of Sciences in 1996, and the Award in the Annual Competition from A.F. Ioffe Physical-Technical Institute in 1985.
