= Tom Baehr-Jones =

American physicist

Tom Baehr-Jones (born January 15, 1980, in Brooklyn, New York) is an American physicist who has made contributions in the field of Nanophotonics. His findings have been published in Nature, Science, Nature Photonics, Nature Materials, the IEEE/OSA Journal of Lightwave Technology, and Optics Express, among many others. Baehr-Jones is a co-founder of Luxtera, Inc. He later joined Prof. Michael Hochberg's group at the University of Washington, and was also a co-founder of Elenion. He later joined Luminous Computing as a senior fellow, and is presently VP of Photonics at Luminous Computing.
