= Shawn Yu Lin =

Taiwanese American scientist (born 1959)

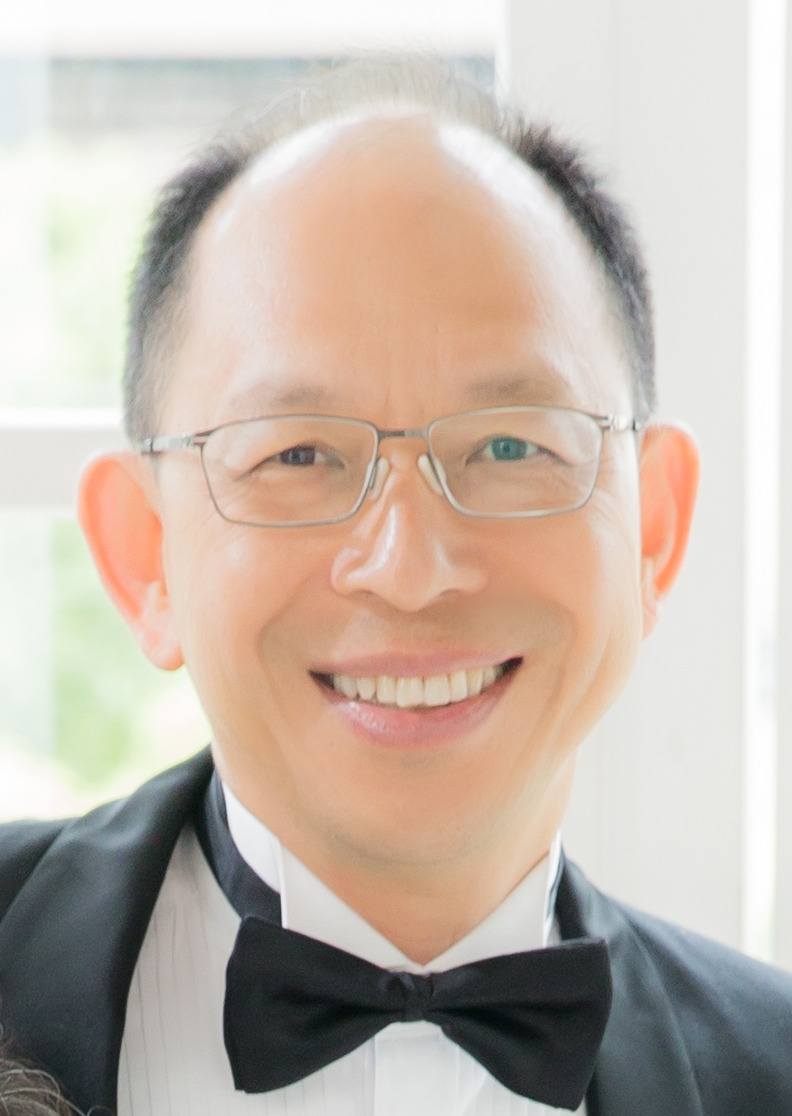
- Shawn Yu Lin on the occasion of a faculty awards ceremony at RPI in Troy NY (2004).
- Born: October 21, 1959 (age 66); Hualien, Taiwan
- Education: Princeton University
- Known for: Pioneering contributions to photonics and photonic crystals
- Scientific career
- Fields: Photonics and photonic crystals
- Workplaces: IBM Research (1992-1994); Sandia (1994-2004); RPI (2004-present)
- Doctoral advisor: Daniel C. Tsui

Shawn Yu Lin (born in 1959 in Taiwan) is a Taiwanese American physicist, researcher, and educator who made pioneering contributions to the field of photonics and photonic crystals. He authored more than 250 technical papers.

== Professional career ==
After graduating from high school in Hualien, Taiwan, Lin attended NTU (Taipei, Taiwan) and received a B.S. in Physics in 1982. Subsequently, he attended UNC-Chapel Hill (Chapel Hill, North Carolina) and received an M.S. in Physics in 1986. Subsequently, he attended Princeton University (Princeton, New Jersey) and received a Ph.D. in Electrical Engineering in 1992.

In 1992, Lin joined the IBM T.J. Watson Research Center, Yorktown Heights, NY, as a Post-doctoral Fellow. In 1994, Lin joined Sandia, Albuquerque, NM, initially as a Member-of-Technical-Staff and later became a Distinguished Member-of-Technical-Staff. Lin also served as Research Professor (Physics) at Iowa State University, Ames, IA (2000-2004), Adjunct Professor (Material Science and Engineering) at Georgia Tech, Atlanta, GA (2002-2004), and Visiting Scientist (Electrical Engineering) at Princeton University, Princeton, NJ (2003-2004). In 2004, he joined RPI, Troy, NY, as a Chaired Professor of Physics.

== Technical contributions ==
Since photonic crystals were first proposed in 1987, researchers have attempted to build practical three-dimensional photonic crystals (PCs). Lin and co-workers took photonic crystals down into the nano-realm using advanced semiconductor processing. In 1998, he developed the first large scale, 3-dimensional photonic crystal having a complete photonic band gap. In the same year, he demonstrated the first diffraction-less guiding and bending of light in a photonic crystal with a bending radius less than the wavelength. In 2015, Lin's research was reported as a candidate for the Nobel Prize in Physics.

In 2002, Lin created the first all-metallic photonic crystal. Upon thermal excitation, the photonic crystal reshapes the blackbody radiation spectrum and produces a coherent thermal emission. Extending this finding, Lin demonstrated that the intense photon field inside the crystal can be amplified through a non-equilibrium plasmonic excitation, leading to an order-of-magnitude enhancement of light emission beyond that predicted by the Planck blackbody radiation law.

In 2007, Lin developed a meta material that constitutes “the blackest material known to science” (quote from Sir John Pendry). Rather than examining a single nanotube, Lin studied the collective behavior of millions of nanotubes arranged in a "nano-forest." The blackest material was shown to absorb 99.97% of incident light, a Guinness world record. A perfectly black material is the pinnacle of stealth technology because it cannot be seen.

== Selected technical papers ==
- "A three-dimensional photonic crystal operating at infrared wavelengths" SY Lin, JG Fleming, DL Hetherington, BK Smith, R Biswas, KM Ho, MM Sigalas, W Zubrzycki, SR Kurtz, Jim Bur, Nature 394 (6690), 251-253 (1998).
- "Optical thin-film materials with low refractive index for broadband elimination of Fresnel reflection" JQ Xi, MF Schubert, JK Kim, EF Schubert, M Chen, SY Lin, W Liu, Joe A Smart, Nature Photonics 1 (3), 176-179 (2007).
- "Experimental demonstration of guiding and bending of electromagnetic waves in a photonic crystal" SY Lin, E Chow, V Hietala, PR Villeneuve, JD Joannopoulos, Science 282 (5387), 274-276 (1998).
- "Experimental observation of an extremely dark material made by a low-density nanotube array" ZP Yang, L Ci, JA Bur, SY Lin, PM Ajayan, Nano Letters 8 (2), 446-451 (2008).
- "All-metallic three-dimensional photonic crystals with a large infrared bandgap" JG Fleming, SY Lin, I El-Kady, R Biswas, KM Ho, Nature 417 (6884), 52-55 (2002).
- "Three-dimensional control of light in a two-dimensional photonic crystal slab" E Chow, SY Lin, SG Johnson, PR Villeneuve, JD Joannopoulos, Joel R Wendt, Gregory A Vawter, W Zubrzycki, H Hou, A Alleman, Nature 407 (6807), 983-986 (2000).
- "Three-dimensional photonic-crystal emitter for thermal photovoltaic power generation" SY Lin, J Moreno, JG Fleming, Applied Physics Letters 83 (2), 380-382 (2003).

== Awards and Distinctions ==
- 1999 Recipient of NOVA Award, Sandia National Laboratories.
- 1999 Recipient of R&D 100 Award, US R&D Magazine.
- 2002 Recipient of the 1st Asia-American Engineer-of-the-Year Award, US Chinese Institute of Engineering.
- 2002 Elected Fellow, APS (List of APS Fellows).
- 2003 Elected Fellow, OSA (List of OSA Fellows).
- 2004 Recipient of New York NYSTAR Distinguished Professor Award.
- 2002-2004 Member, Technical Advisory Committee, ITRI, Taiwan.
- 2002-2004 Member, Nano Advisory Committee, ITRI, Taiwan.
- 2004 Appointed Constellation Chair Professor, RPI.
- 2004 Appointed Chair Professor, NCTU.
- 2008 Awarded Guinness World Record for discovering “the darkest material.”
- 2010-2012 Appointed Chair Professor, National Taiwan Normal University.
- 2012 Elected Fellow, AAAS (List of 2012 AAAS Fellows).
- 2016 Recipient of the IEEE "Pioneer Award in Nanotechnology.”
- 2017 Elected Fellow, SPIE (List of SPIE Fellows).
