= Equilibrium mode distribution =

Light distribution

The equilibrium mode [power] distribution of light travelling in an optical waveguide or fiber, is the distribution of light that is no longer changing with fibre length or with input modal excitation. This phenomenon requires both mode filtering and mode mixing to occur in the fibre to produce a state that is independent of the mode power distribution launched by the light source. At propagation distances exceeding the equilibrium length, intramodal pulse distortion increases (bandwidth decreases) as the square root of length.

The term equilibrium length is sometimes used to describe a stationary mode distribution, which is the length of multi-mode optical fiber necessary to attain a static mode distribution from a specific excitation condition. Equilibrium length is, strictly, the longest such length, as would result from a widely variable range of input excitation. Other terms for equilibrium length are equilibrium coupling length and equilibrium mode distribution length.

Equilibrium mode [power] distributions were reported in early multimode transmission systems at propagation distances as short as a few hundred metres. However, as fibre manufacturing improved, the minute waveguide dimensional and structural changes that produce mode-mixing have been greatly reduced. The length of fibre required to attain true equilibrium is now much greater than the length of practical multimode transmission systems, which makes the term effectively obsolete.

In the absence of strong mode-mixing, high order mode filtering is the primary remaining mechanism for potential change of an input mode power distribution. If a well-aligned laser is the optical source, the mode power distribution is highly concentrated in the lowest order modes, and remains essentially unchanged with distance due to the lack of mode-mixing. If an optical source that overfills the fibre is used, only the highest order guided mode group experiences excess attenuation, and the mode power distribution becomes slightly filtered as a result. (Mandrel wrapping is a viable method to artificially create this state.) Such mode power distributions are stationary; neither changes with fibre length, but equilibrium does not exist in either case because the distributions remain dependent on the input power distribution.

== See also ==
- Mode coupling
- Mode volume
- Mode scrambler
