= Mona Berciu =

Romanian-Canadian physicist

Mona Inesa Berciu is a Romanian-Canadian theoretical condensed matter physicist whose research involves electromagnetic effects in materials, including ferromagnetism, superconductivity, magnetic semiconductors, photonic band gaps, polarons, spintronics, and the quantum Hall effect. She is a professor of physics at the University of British Columbia.

== Education and career ==
Berciu represented Romania in the 1989 International Physics Olympiad, earning an honorable mention and a prize for the best female competitor. She was an undergraduate at the University of Bucharest, where she earned a bachelor's degree in physics in 1994. She came to the University of Toronto for graduate study in physics, earned a master's degree in 1995, and completed her Ph.D. in 1999. Her dissertation, A microscopic model for non-Fermi-liquid behavior and charge carrier pairing in a purely repulsive 2D electron system, was supervised by Sajeev John.

After postdoctoral research with Ravindra N. Bhatt at Princeton University, she joined the University of British Columbia as an assistant professor of physics in 2002. She has been a full professor since 2012.

== Recognition ==
The Canadian Association of Physicists gave Berciu their 2013 CAP Medal for Excellence in Teaching Undergraduate Physics, "in recognition of for her exceptional ability to communicate knowledge and understanding and lead students to high academic achievement in physics through her own example, for her leading role in the Welcome Women (WOW) initiative to recruit female students and for her efforts to generally improve the quality of physics teaching through such work as undertaken by the Carl Weiman Science Education Initiative."

She was named as a Fellow of the American Physical Society (APS) in 2019, after a nomination from the APS Division of Condensed Matter Physics, "for outstanding contributions to the theory of dilute magnetic semiconductors and polarons".
