= Thomas F Krauss =

Thomas F Krauss FRSE is a physics researcher at the University of York, where he is the head of the photonics group and of the nanocentre cleanroom. Before he was head of the school of physics and astronomy at the University of St Andrews. He has several research interests, but is mostly known for his work in the field of photonic crystals, where he made the first demonstration of two-dimensional photonic band-gap effects at optical wavelengths. More recently, his research has been to use slow-light in photonic crystal waveguides in order to improve the performance of optoelectronic components. He serves as editor-in-chief of the journal Optica.

Krauss has been at the University of St Andrews since 2000, when he set up the Photonic Crystal Research Group (now called St Andrews Microphotonics). At St Andrews, Krauss holds the chair of Professor of Optoelectronics. He is also a Fellow of the Royal Society of Edinburgh and a Fellow of the Institute of Physics, both after being elected in 2002.

Krauss has works in the field of integrated optics since 1987, when he spent one year at IBM Yorktown Heights. He completed his PhD on semi-conductor ring lasers at the University of Glasgow, where he stayed until the year 2000, excepting for one year spent at Caltech in 1997. At Glasgow, he initiated the field of study in Photonic Band-gap materials, and made the first demonstration of a 2D photonic band-gap at optical wavelengths.
