= Eli Yablonovitch =

American physicist

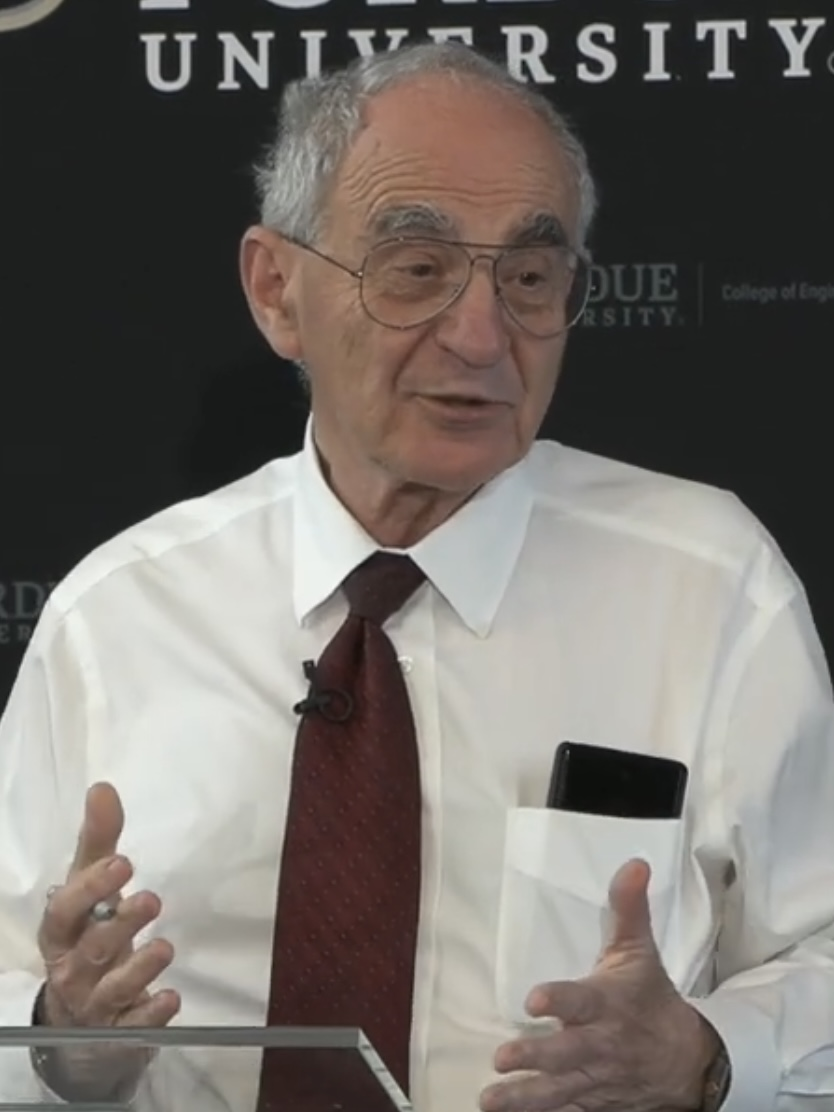
- Yablonovitch in 2024
- Born: 15 December 1946 (age 79); Puch bei Hallein, Austria
- Education: McGill University; Harvard University
- Known for: Photonic crystals; Solar cells
- Awards: Benjamin Franklin Medal; Frederic Ives Medal; IEEE Edison Medal; Isaac Newton Medal; Oliver E. Buckley Condensed Matter Prize; Rank Prize; Harvey Prize; IEEE Photonics Award; Mountbatten Medal; R. W. Wood Prize; Adolph Lomb Medal
- Scientific career
- Fields: Physics, Electrical Engineering
- Workplaces: McGill University; Harvard University; Bell Telephone Laboratories; Exxon; Bell Communications Research; University of California, Los Angeles; University of California, Berkeley
- Doctoral advisor: Nicolaas Bloembergen

Eli Yablonovitch (born 15 December 1946) is an American physicist and engineer who, along with Sajeev John, founded the field of photonic crystals in 1987. He and his team were the first to create a 3-dimensional structure that exhibited a full photonic bandgap, which has been named Yablonovite. In addition to pioneering photonic crystals, he was the first to recognize that a strained quantum-well laser has a significantly reduced threshold current compared to its unstrained counterpart. This is now employed in the majority of semiconductor lasers fabricated throughout the world. His seminal paper reporting inhibited spontaneous emission in photonic crystals is among the most highly cited papers in physics and engineering.

== Career ==
Yablonovitch received his B.Sc. in physics from McGill University in 1967. He went on to receive his A.M. degree in applied physics from Harvard University in 1969, and his Ph.D. from Harvard in 1972. During his post-graduate studies, Yablonovitch worked on nonlinear optics with carbon dioxide lasers.

After receiving his Ph.D., Yablonovitch worked at Bell Laboratories. He then became a professor of applied physics at Harvard in 1974. In 1979, he joined Exxon research center to work on photovoltaic research for solar energy. While working at Exxon, Yablonovitch derived the 4 (n squared) factor as the theoretical limit for light trapping in photovoltaics. This is now used worldwide in almost all solar panels.

Yablonovitch joined Bell Communications Research in 1984, and became its director of solid-state physics research in 1991. During his time at Bell Communications, Yablonovitch did his pioneering work on photonic crystals.

Yablonovitch became a professor of electrical engineering at UCLA and continued to study and develop photonic crystals and photonic bandgap materials. In July 2007, he joined the Electrical Engineering and Computer Sciences department at UC Berkeley. His research topics include silicon photonics, telecommunications, optical antennas, new applications of photovoltaics, and searching for a low-voltage replacement for the transistor. Recently he has investigated analog computing approaches to solving hard problems, such as the traveling salesman problem.

== Entrepreneurship ==
Yablonovitch has co-founded multiple companies related to his research interests. In 2000, he co-founded Ethertronics Inc. Ethertronics is a cell phone antenna manufacturer that has, to date, shipped over 1.7 billion antennas.

In 2001, Yablonovitch co-founded Luxtera Inc., a semiconductor company that makes electro‑optical systems using silicon photonics, manufactured with CMOS processes. Luxtera is the first company to market foundry-based silicon photonics.

Yablonovitch co-founded Luminescent Inc. in 2002. Luminescent provided sophisticated mathematical optimization for use in photolithography masks. Luminescent was acquired by Synopsys in 2012.

In 2008, Yablonovitch founded Alta Devices Inc. Alta Devices produces thin-film gallium arsenide photovoltaic cells for solar energy. Alta Devices currently holds the efficiency world record for single junction solar cells at 29.1% and dual junction solar cells at 31.6%, both at 1 sun illumination.

== Fellowships and awards ==
He is a Fellow of the Institute of Electrical and Electronics Engineers (IEEE), the Optical Society of America (OSA), and the American Physical Society (APS).

He was elected a member of the National Academy of Sciences, the National Academy of Engineering, the National Academy of Inventors, the American Academy of Arts and Sciences, and a Foreign Member of the Royal Society of London.

He is a recipient of the:

- 1978 Adolph Lomb Medal;
- 1993 W. Streifer Scientific Achievement Award;
- 1996 R. W. Wood Prize;
- 2001 Julius Springer Prize;
- 2010 Mountbatten Medal of the Institution of Engineering and Technology (IET);
- 2011 Clarivate Citation laureate in Physics, shared with Sajeev John, "for their invention and development of photonic band gap materials.";
- 2012 IEEE Photonics Award;
- 2012 Harvey Prize;
- 2014 Rank Prize for Optoelectronics;
- 2015 Isaac Newton Medal by Institute of Physics;
- 2016 Oliver E. Buckley Condensed Matter Prize;
- 2017 IEEE William R. Cherry Award—the IEEE's highest award in solar cells;
- 2018 IEEE Edison Medal;
- 2019 Frederic Ives Medal / Jarus W. Quinn Prize—the Optical Society's highest award;
- 2019 Benjamin Franklin medal.

== See also ==
- Alf Adams. Introduced the idea of the Strained Laser at nearly the same time as Yablonovitch.
