= Mode volume =

Number of bound modes that an optical fiber is capable of supporting

Mode volume may refer to figures of merit used either to characterise optical and microwave cavities or optical fibers.

== In electromagnetic cavities ==
The mode volume (or modal volume) of an optical or microwave cavity is a measure of how concentrated the electromagnetic energy of a single cavity mode is in space, expressed as an effective volume in which most of the energy associated with an electromagentic mode is confined. Various expressions may be used to estimate this volume:

- The volume that would be occupied by the mode if its electromagnetic energy density was constant and equal to its maximum value

$$V_{m} = \frac{\int \epsilon |E|^{2} dV}{\rm{max}(\epsilon |E|^{2})} \;\;\; \rm{or} \;\;\;
V_{m} = \frac{\int (|B|^{2}/\mu) \; dV}{\rm{max}(|B|^{2}/\mu )}$$

- The volume over which the electromagnetic energy density exceeds some threshold (e.g., half the maximum energy density)

$$V_{m} = \int \left(|E|^{2} > \frac{|E_{max}|^{2}}{2}\right) dV$$

- The volume that would be occupied by the mode if its electromagnetic energy density was constant and equal to a weighted average value that emphasises higher energy densities.

$$V_{m} = \frac{(\int |E|^{2} dV)^{2}}{\int |E|^{4} dV} \;\;\; \rm{or} \;\;\;
V_{m} = \frac{(\int |B|^{2} dV)^{2}}{\int |B|^{4} dV}$$

where $E$ is the electric field strength, $B$ is the magnetic flux density, $\epsilon$ is the electric permittivity, $\mu$ denotes the magnetic permeability, and $\max(\cdots)$ denotes the maximum value of its functional argument. In each definition the integral is over all space and may diverge in leaky cavities where the electromagnetic energy can radiate out to infinity and is thus not is not confined within the cavity volume. In this case modifications to the expressions above may be required to give an effective mode volume.

The mode volume of a cavity or resonator is of particular importance in cavity quantum electrodynamics where it determines the magnitude of the Purcell effect and coupling strength between cavity photons and atoms in the cavity. In particular, the Purcell factor is given by

$$F_{\rm P} = \frac{3}{4\pi^2}\left(\frac{\lambda_{\rm free}}{n}\right)^3 \frac{Q}{V_m}\,,$$

where $\lambda_{\rm free}$ is the vacuum wavelength, $n$ is the refractive index of the cavity material (so $\lambda_{\rm free}/n$ is the wavelength inside the cavity), and $Q$ and $V_m$ are the cavity quality factor and mode volume, respectively.

== In fiber optics ==
In fiber optics, mode volume is the number of bound modes that an optical fiber is capable of supporting.

The mode volume M is approximately given by $V^2 \over 2$ and ${V^2 \over 2} \left({g \over g+2}\right)$, respectively for step-index and power-law index profile fibers, where g is the profile parameter, and V is the normalized frequency, which must be greater than 5 for this approximation to be valid.

== See also ==
- Electromagnetic resonator
- Purcell effect
- Cavity quantum electrodynamics
- Cavity perturbation theory
- Quantum optics
- Equilibrium mode distribution
- Mode scrambler
- Mandrel wrapping
