= Phaedon Avouris =

Greek scientist (born 1945)

Phaedon Avouris (Greek: Φαίδων Αβούρης) is a Greek chemical physicist specializing in nanoscience and nanotechnology. His research at the IBM Thomas J. Watson Research Center focuses on the applications of molecular devices in computing and electronics. This includes experimental and theoretical studies on the electronics and photonics of carbon nanotubes (CNT) and graphene.

== Biography ==
Phaedon Avouris was born in 1945 in Athens, Greece. In 1968, he received a BSc in chemistry from the Aristotle University in Thessaloniki, Greece. After postdoctoral work at the University of California, Los Angeles, he attended Michigan State University in 1974 and earned a PhD in physical chemistry. Avouris was an adjunct research professor at Columbia University, NY in 2003 and was appointed an Adjunct Research Professor in the ECE Department at the University of Illinois, Urbana-Champaign in 2016.

== Awards and honours ==
Avouris is a member of the following academies and societies:

- National Academy of Sciences (elected 2017)
- American Academy of Arts and Sciences (elected 2003)
- Academy of Athens, (corresponding member, elected 2007)
- IBM Academy of Technology (elected 2004)

He is also a fellow of the:

- American Physical Society (APS), 1987
- Institute of Physics (U.K.), 2004
- Institute of Electrical and Electronics Engineers (IEEE), 2014
- American Association for the Advancement of Science (AAAS), 1996
- Materials Research Society (MRS), 2011
- American Vacuum Society (AVS), 1997
- World Technology Network, 1999

Avouris's work has been recognized with awards from scientific institutions, including:

- Irving Langmuir Prize for Chemical Physics, American Physical Society, 2003
- Medard W. Welch Award for Surface Science, American Vacuum Society, 1997
- IEEE Nanotechnology Section, Pioneer Award in Nanotechnology, 2010
- Richard Feynman Prize for Nanotechnology, Foresight Institute, 1999
- Julius Springer Prize for Applied Physics (with T. Heinz), 2008
- MRS David Turnbull Lectureship, Materials Research Society, 2011
- Richard E. Smalley Prize of the Electrochemical Society, 2009
- H. Bloch Medal, Excellence of Research in Industry, Univ. of Chicago, 2015
- IBM Exceptional Achievement Corporate Award, 2011
- Outstanding Technical Achievement Awards, IBM Corporation, 1989, 1993, 2000, 2002, 2003, 2013, 2015
- Honorary Doctorate, International Hellenic University, 2013
- Member of the National Academy of Sciences, 2017
- Distinguished Alumnus Award, Michigan State University, 2001

== General references ==
- Avouris, Phaedon (1 March 1995). "Manipulation of Matter at the Atomic and Molecular Levels". Accounts of Chemical Research. 28 (3): 95–102. doi:10.1021/ar00051a002. ISSN 0001-4842.
- Avouris, Phaedon (1 January 2009). "Carbon nanotube electronics and photonics". Physics Today. 62 (1): 34–40. Bibcode:2009PhT....62a..34A. doi:10.1063/1.3074261. ISSN 0031-9228.
- Weiss, Paul S. (28 December 2010). "A Conversation with Dr. Phaedon Avouris: Nanoscience Leader". ACS Nano. 4 (12): 7041–7047. doi:10.1021/nn1032032. ISSN 1936-0851. PMID 21186842.
- Avouris, Phaedon; Freitag, Marcus; Perebeinos, Vasili (2008). "Carbon-nanotube photonics and optoelectronics". Nature Photonics. 2 (6): 341–350. Bibcode:2008NaPho...2..341A. doi:10.1038/nphoton.2008.94. ISSN 1749-4885.
- Avouris, Phaedon; Dimitrakopoulos, Christos (2012). "Graphene: synthesis and applications". Materials Today. 15 (3): 86–97. doi:10.1016/S1369-7021(12)70044-5.
- Xia, Fengnian; Yan, Hugen; Avouris, Phaedon (2013). "The Interaction of Light and Graphene: Basics, Devices, and Applications". Proceedings of the IEEE. 101 (7): 1717–1731. doi:10.1109/JPROC.2013.2250892. ISSN 0018-9219.
- Low, Tony; Avouris, Phaedon (31 January 2014). "Graphene Plasmonics for Terahertz to Mid-Infrared Applications". ACS Nano. 8 (2): 1086–1101. arXiv:1403.2799. doi:10.1021/nn406627u. ISSN 1936-0851. PMID 24484181.
