= Animal reflectors =

Animal reflectors or animal mirrors are important to the survival of many kinds of animal, and, in some cases, have been mimicked by engineers developing photonic crystals. Examples are the scales of silvery fish, and the tapetum lucidum that causes the eyeshine of dogs and cats. All these reflectors work by interference of light in multilayer structures with dimensions less than a wavelength, so can be classed as photonic crystals. Other animal photonic crystals have evolved to reflect narrow spectra, producing animal coloration.

== Functions ==
=== Camouflage ===
The scales of silvery fish, by reflecting light from the flank make detection by a predator difficult because the reflected light is similar to the incident light in the absence of the prey (Fig. 1).

=== Focusing light ===
The eyes of some bivalve mollusks, such as the scallop (Pecten) use a concave mirror, the argentea, at the back of the eye, to create an image on the retina. The deep-sea ostracod Gigantocypris has eyes with parabolic reflectors. The compound eyes of long-bodied decapod crustaceans, such as shrimps and lobsters, use mirrors in square boxes

=== Increasing retinal sensitivity ===
Most nocturnal vertebrates have a reflecting tapetum lucidum behind the retina, which produces the 'eyeshine' seen in cats and dogs. Incoming photons that are not absorbed by the photoreceptors are reflected back, increasing their chances of being absorbed and generating nerve signals.

== Mechanisms of reflection ==
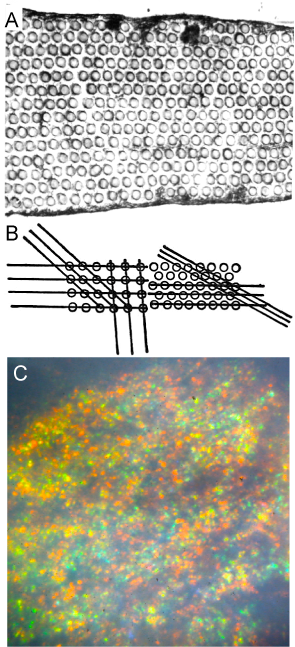
A. The cells of the tapetum of the cat contain arrays of rodlets with a spacing at about λ/2. B. Different lattice planes have different spacings and reflect different wavelengths. C. The different domains of rodlets reflect different wavelengths to give an overall reflection with a wide spectral range.

Schultze, in 1872, stated without reservation that reflection from the multilayered structure of the tapeta of Carnivora is by interference. Rayleigh (1887) mentions that a reflector composed of a stack of thin transparent layers will reflect more strongly than a single layer, but only in 1917 did he publish a mathematical analysis. Multilayer reflectors were constructed by engineers in the 1950s (see dielectric mirror) and in 1966 M.F. Land published a full analysis of an animal reflector that included electron microscopy, optical measurements, and a clear explanation of the theory

=== Reflectors with a one-dimensional multilayer structure ===
Animal multilayer reflectors work in the same way as a man-made dielectric mirror (or Bragg mirror) being composed of alternating layers of high and low refractive index, the thickness of each layer being 1/4 the wavelength most strongly reflected. To reflect a wide range of wavelengths, the spacing must vary through the thickness of the stack. Reflectors made of alternating layers of flat guanine crystals (refractive index, n = 1.83) and cytoplasm (n ≈ 1.33) have evolved independently in fish scales and in the tapeta of the eyes of elasmobranchs (Gur 2017). The tapetum of the bush-baby, Galago crassicaudatus, has a similar structure, but with crystals of riboflavin (n = 1.73).

=== Reflectors with a two-dimensional structure ===
The tapetum of Carnivora (cats, dogs, lions etc.) contains remarkably regular arrays of rodlets, and reflects light from planes of the lattice by Bragg's Law (Fig. 2A). Each domain of rodlets has a different spacing and reflects a different colour from the main plane (shown horizontal in Fig. 2B) so with near-parallel illumination, spots of different colors are seen (Fig.1C). Because there are lattice planes at many inclinations, the tapetum as a whole reflects diffusely and is scarcely iridescent.
