= Sajeev John =

Physicist

- Born: January 1, 1957 (age 69)
- Education: Massachusetts Institute of Technology; Harvard University
- Awards: Herzberg Medal (1996); Steacie Prize (1997); King Faisal Prize (2001); Platinum Medal for Science and Medicine (2002); Brockhouse Medal (2007); LEOS Quantum Electronics Award (2007); Pioneer Award in Nanotechnology (2008); David Sarnoff Award (2013); Killam Prize (2014); Order of Canada (2017); Herzberg Canada Gold Medal (2021); APS Fellow; Optica Fellow; Fellow of Royal Society of Canada; Fellow of the Royal Society (2025)
- Scientific career
- Workplaces: University of Toronto
- Doctoral students: Mona Berciu
- Website: www.physics.utoronto.ca/~john/

Sajeev John (born 1957) is an Indian Canadian physicist who is a professor of physics at the University of Toronto and Canada Research Chair holder. He is known for his discovery of photonic crystals.

== Education and career ==
He received his bachelor's degree in physics in 1979 from the Massachusetts Institute of Technology and his Ph.D. in physics at Harvard University in 1984. His Ph.D. work at Harvard introduced the theory of classical wave localization and, in particular, the localization of light in three-dimensional strongly scattering dielectrics. From 1984 to 1986 he was a Natural Sciences and Engineering Research Council of Canada postdoctoral fellow at the University of Pennsylvania, as well as a laboratory consultant to the Corporate Research Science Laboratories of Exxon Research and Engineering from 1985 to 1989.

From 1986 to 1989 he was an assistant professor of physics at Princeton University. In 1987, while at Princeton he co-invented, along with Eli Yablonovitch, the concept of a new class of materials with a photonic band gap called photonic crystals. This provided a fuller explanation of his original conception (1984) of the localization of light. He was a laboratory consultant to Bell Communications Research (Red Bank, NJ) in 1989. In 1989 he joined the senior physics faculty at the University of Toronto. He has been a Principal Investigator for Photonics Research Ontario and is a fellow of the Canadian Institute for Advanced Research.

== Recognition ==
John is the winner of the 2001 King Faisal International Prize in Science, which he shared with C. N. Yang. He is also the first winner of Canada’s Platinum Medal for Science and Medicine in 2002. John is the winner of the Institute of Electrical and Electronics Engineers (IEEE) LEOS International Quantum Electronics Award in 2007 for “the invention and development of light-trapping crystals and elucidation of their properties and applications.” He is the 2008 winner of the IEEE Pioneer Award in Nanotechnology and the 2013 IEEE David Sarnoff Award. In 2011, John was selected as a Thomson-Reuters Citation Laureate. John was awarded the Killam Prize in Natural Sciences for 2014 by the Canada Council for the Arts. In 2017, he was appointed as an Officer of the Order of Canada "For his revolutionary contributions to optical sciences, notably for his role in the development of new structures capable of harnessing the flow of light." In 2021, John was awarded the Herzberg Canada Gold Medal by the Natural Sciences and Engineering Research Council of Canada. He was elected a Fellow of the Royal Society in 2025.

John also received the 1996 Herzberg Medal for Physics and the 2007 Brockhouse Medal for Condensed Matter and Materials Physics from the Canadian Association of Physicists. He received the first McLean Fellowship from the University of Toronto in 1996, the 1997 Steacie Prize in Science and Engineering from the National Research Council of Canada, and the 2004 Rutherford Medal from the Royal Society of Canada. He is the first winner of Brockhouse Canada Prize in 2004, which he shared with materials chemist Geoffrey Ozin for their groundbreaking interdisciplinary work on photonic band gap materials synthesis. John has also received the Killam Fellowship of the Canada Council for the Arts, the Guggenheim Fellowship (USA), the Japan Society for the Promotion of Science Fellowship, and the Humboldt Senior Scientist Award (Germany). In 2007, John was awarded the C.V. Raman Chair Professorship of the Government of India. John is a Fellow of the American Physical Society, the Optical Society of America, the Royal Society of Canada, and a member of the Max Planck Society of Germany. He was the 2011 Elizabeth R. Laird Lecturer at the Memorial University of Newfoundland.
