= Paras N. Prasad =

Indian American chemist

- Born: 1946 (age 79–80); Sitamarhi, Bihar
- Spouse: Sumi

Academic background
- Education: BSc, MSc, Bihar University; PhD, 1971, University of Pennsylvania
- Thesis: Dynamics of energy states in molecular solids. (1971)

Academic work
- Institutions: University at Buffalo

Paras Nath Prasad (born in 1946) is an Indian chemist. He is the SUNY Distinguished Professor at the University at Buffalo and holds a tenured faculty appointment in the department of Chemistry. In addition, he also holds non-tenured appointments in Physics, Medicine, and Electrical Engineering at the University at Buffalo and serves as the executive director of the Institute for Lasers, Photonics and Biophotonics.

== Early life and education ==
Prasad was born in 1946 in Sitamarhi, Bihar. He obtained his Bachelor of Science degree and Master's degree at the Babasaheb Bhimrao Ambedkar Bihar University and his PhD from the University of Pennsylvania. His doctoral research was in the area of biophotonics.

== Career ==
Prasad joined the faculty at the University at Buffalo (UB) in 1974. He has conducted research on two-photon technology and has served as Director of the Photonics Research Laboratory. He has served as executive director of the Institute for Research in Lasers, Photonics and Biophotonics. Prasad has contributed to the development of photonic materials for biomedical applications including nanoshells containing various diagnostic and therapeutic agents He has published a book entitled "Nanophotonics,"."

Prasad has contributed to research at the Royal Institute of Technology by serving as an external advisor in two projects in biotechnology and nanotechnology. He was awarded an honorary doctorate by the institution in 2013.

=== Awards and honors ===
He was elected a Fellow of the Optical Society in 1994. He received a 1997 John Simon Guggenheim Fellowship in Engineering. He was named the Samuel P. Capen Professor of Chemistry and earned the 1999 Jacob F. Schoellkopf Medal from the American Chemical Society "for his outstanding achievements in spectroscopy and materials science specifically focused on photonics technology." He was elected a fellow of the International Society for Optical Engineering and was named by Scientific American as one of the Scientific American 50 in 2005. In 2003, he along with many other faculty were honored by the State University of New York." He was named an honorary professor at Zhejiang University in 2006.

In 2014, Prasad received UB's first Innovation Impact Award in recognition of his work in "developing the use of magnetic and laser-activated nanoparticles for cancer diagnosis and treatment." He received the UB President's Medal in recognition of extraordinary service to the university. He was named a Fellow of the National Academy of Inventors, and earned the Gold Medal of the International Society for Optics and Photonics (SPIE). In 2017, he received the American Chemical Society Peter Debye Award in Physical Chemistry, IEEE Nanotechnology Council Pioneer Award in Nanotechnology, and Michael S. Feld Biophotonics Award from the Optical Society.

In 2018, Prasad was elected a Fellow of the Institute of Electrical and Electronics Engineers for his contributions in biophotonics, nanophotonics and novel biomedical technology. He was named to the clarivate Analytics 2018 Highly Cited Researchers list. In June 2021, Prasad received the IEEE Photonics Society William Streifer Scientific Achievement Award for "pioneering contributions in multiphoton processes in molecular materials and developing technologies that advance biophotonics for multiphoton imaging and therapy."

== Selected publications ==
- Introduction to Biophotonics (2003)
- Nanophotonics (2004)
