= Larry Dalton =

American chemist

Larry Dalton (born April 25, 1943) is an American chemist best known for his work in polymeric nonlinear electro-optics.

== Early years ==
Professor Larry Dalton was born on a farm near Belpre, Ohio on April 25, 1943. He attended Michigan State University from 1962 to 1966 earning B.S. (1965, Honors College, highest honors) and M.S. (1966, Sigma Xi Graduate Research Award) degrees in chemistry working with Professor James L. Dye (primary research advisor) and Professor Carl Brubaker. He attended Harvard University from 1966 to 1971 supported by an NIH Predoctoral Fellowship and pursued research on various aspects of magnetic resonance spectroscopy with Professor Alvin Kwiram.

In 1971, he joined the faculty of Vanderbilt University and accepted a consultantship at Varian Associates. As an assistant professor, he introduced the concept of Saturation Transfer Spectroscopy and was the recipient of an Alfred P. Sloan Fellowship, a Camille and Henry Dreyfus Teacher Scholar Award, and an NIH Research Career Development Award.

In 1976, Larry joined the faculty of the State University of New York at Stony Brook where he served as Associate Professor and Professor of Chemistry until 1982. At SUNY-SB, Larry pursued research on red blood cell proteins and on conducting (electroactive) polymers such as polyacetylene. He served on numerous NIH study sections and review panels including the Parent Committee for the National Sickle Cell Anemia Program.

In 1982, he joined the faculty of the University of Southern California as Professor of Chemistry where he pursued research on nonlinear optics and nonlinear optical materials and on DNA mutagenesis (collaborating with Professor Myron Goodman) for the next 20 years. In 1994, Larry became the inaugural Harold and Lillian Moulton Professor of Chemistry, Scientific Co-Director of the Loker Hydrocarbon Research Institute, and Professor of Materials Science and Engineering. He also served as Director of the Department of Defense Multidisciplinary University Research Initiative Center on Materials and Processing at the Nanometer Scale. Awards at USC include the 1986 Burlington Northern Faculty Achievement Award, the 1990 USC Associates Award for Creativity in Research and Scholarship, and the 1996 Richard C. Tolman Award of the Southern California Section of the American Chemical Society.

In 1998, Larry joined the faculty of the University of Washington as the inaugural George B. Kauffman Professor of Chemistry and Electrical Engineering where his personal research focuses on nonlinear optical materials and devices and upon sensor technology. He also serves as Director of the National Science Foundation Science and Technology Center on Materials and Devices for Information Technology Research, the Department of Defense Multidisciplinary University Research Initiative Center on Polymeric Smart Skin Materials, the DARPA MORPH (Supermolecular Photonics) Program, the DARPA CS-WDM Program, and the NSF NIRT Program on Optoelectronic Materials. He is a Co-Founder and Co-Principal Investigator of the Center for Technology Entrepreneurship and a Research Fellow of the UW School of Business. He was also one of the principals in founding the Nanotechnology Center and the Nanotechnology PhD Program at the University of Washington. Awards at UW include the 2003 American Chemical Society Award in the Chemistry of Materials and QEM (Quality Education for Minorities)/MSE (Mathematics, Science, and Engineering) Network 2005 Giants in Science Award. In 1999, Larry became the first chemistry or electrical engineering faculty member to be elected to the Washington Teaching Academy/Institute for Teaching Excellence (1999). In 2000, Larry received a Distinguished Alumni Award from Michigan State University

== Controversy ==
Two of Dalton's papers have been retracted from the chemistry journal Inorganica Chimica Acta. The first paper contains, without attribution, both text taken verbatim and spectra copied directly from an English translation of a paper published in Fiz. Tverd. Tela (English: Physics of the Solid State). A second paper was retracted from the same journal, 47 years later, due to a disagreement over attribution. The latter scientific work was subsequently published with additional authors, as well as author Sei-Hum Jang moving from a relatively insignificant role (second-to-last) to leading author.

Throughout these retraction controversies Dalton's company, Lumera, and wife's family's foundation, The Boand Family Foundation, donated upwards of 20 million dollars to the University of Washington. These donations, and the University's response to Dalton's actions, prompted increased scrutiny on the University of Washington's conflict of interest safeguards and procedures.
