= Mandrel wrapping =

In multimode fibre optics, mandrel wrapping is a technique used to preferentially attenuate high-order mode power of a propagating optical signal. Consequently, if the fibre is propagating substantial energy in affected modes, the modal distribution will be changed.

A cylindrical rod wrap consists of a specified number turns of fibre on a mandrel of specified size, depending on the fibre characteristics and the desired modal distribution. It has application in optical transmission performance tests, to create a defined mode power distribution or to prevent multimode propagation in single mode fibre. If the launch fibre is fully filled ahead of the mandrel wrap, the higher-order modes will be stripped off, leaving only lower-order modes. If the launch fibre is underfilled, for example as a consequence of being energized by a laser diode or edge-emitting LED, there will be no effect on the mode power distribution or loss measurements.

In multimode fibre, mandrel wrapping is used to eliminate the effect of "transient loss", the tendency of high-order modes to experience higher loss than lower-order modes. Numerical addition (in decibels) of the measured loss of multiple fibre segments and/or components overestimates the loss of the concatenated set if each segment or component has been measured with a full mode power distribution.

In single-mode optical fibre measurements, it is used to enforce true single-mode propagation at wavelengths near or below the theoretical cutoff wavelength, at which substantial power can exist in a higher-order mode group. In this use, it is commonly termed a High Order Mode Filter (HOMF).

Ultimately, the effect of mandrel wrapping on optical measurements depends on the propagating mode power distribution. An additional loss mechanism has no effect unless power is present in the affected modes.

== Principle of operation ==
The effect of physically bending an optical fibre around a cylindrical form is to slightly modify the effective refractive index in the curved region, which locally reduces the effective mode volume of the fibre. This causes optical power in the highest order modes to become unguided, or so weakly guided as to be released into an unbound state, absorbed by the fibre coating or completely ejected from the fibre. The practical effect of mandrel wrapping is to attenuate optical power propagating in the highest-order modes. Lower-order modes are unaffected, experiencing neither increased loss nor conversion into other modes (mode mixing).

== Determination of appropriate mandrel wrap conditions ==
The mandrel diameter and number of turns are chosen to eliminate certain modes in a reproducible way. It is empirically observed that more than 5 full 360-degree wraps creates little additional loss, so 3 to 5 turns are commonly specified. The mandrel diameter affects how far into the mode volume the modal unbinding occurs. Experimentally, one plots the transmitted power from a wrapped fibre into which a uniform modal power distribution has been excited, as a function of mandrel diameter, maintaining a constant number of turns. This reveals step-like reductions in transmitted power as the diameter decreases, where each step is the point at which the mandrel is beginning to affect the next-lower mode group. For best measurement reproducibility, one would select a diameter that is not near such a transition, although this may not be possible if measurements must be performed over a range of wavelengths. Total mode volume in a fiber is a function of wavelength, so the mandrel diameter at which the mode group transitions occur will change with wavelength.

== See also ==
- Mode scrambler
