= Supriyo Bandyopadhyay =

Indian-born American electrical engineer

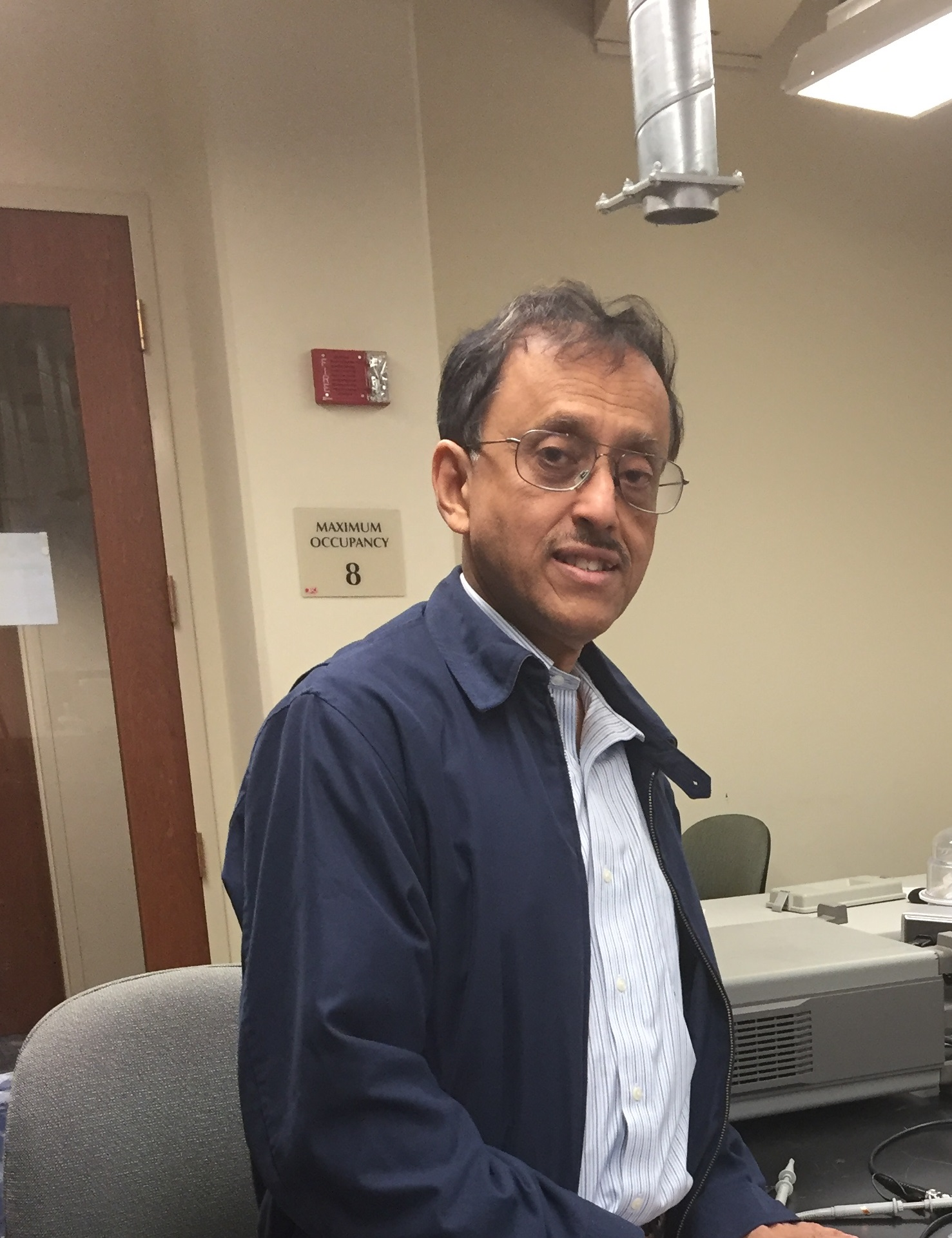
- Education: IIT Kharagpur; Southern Illinois University; Purdue University
- Occupations: Electrical engineer, academic and researcher
- Awards: Fellow, APS and IEEE
- Scientific career
- Workplaces: Virginia Commonwealth University

Supriyo Bandyopadhyay is an Indian-born American electrical engineer, academic and researcher. He is Commonwealth Professor of Electrical and Computer Engineering at Virginia Commonwealth University. Bandyopadhyay has worked on a range of topics including spintronics, straintronics, nanoelectronics and related aspects of nanotechnology.

== Education ==
Bandyopadhyay received his B.Tech. degree in Electronics and Electrical Communications Engineering from Indian Institute of Technology, Kharagpur in 1980. He then earned his M.S. degree in Electrical Engineering from Southern Illinois University in 1982, and a Ph.D. degree in Electrical Engineering from Purdue University in 1985.

== Career ==
Following his Doctoral degree, Bandyopadhyay held a brief appointment as a Visiting Assistant Professor of Electrical Engineering at Purdue University before joining the University of Notre Dame in 1987 as an Assistant Professor of Electrical Engineering. From 1990 till 1996, he served as an Associate Professor there. He subsequently joined the University of Nebraska-Lincoln as a Professor of Electrical Engineering in 1996. In 2001, he joined Virginia Commonwealth University and held a primary appointment as Professor of Electrical Engineering in the Department of Electrical and Computer Engineering and courtesy appointment as a Professor of Physics in the Department of Physics. Since 2011, he has been serving as Commonwealth Professor Virginia Commonwealth University.

Bandyopadhyay served as a Jefferson Science Fellow for the US National Academies of Science, Engineering and Medicine during 2020–2021 and was a Senior Adviser to the USAID Bureau of Europe and Eurasia in the Division of Energy and Infrastructure at Washington, DC. He is a member of the Institute of Electrical and Electronics Engineers (IEEE) Technical Committee on Spintronics (Nanotechnology Council), and past-chair of the Technical Committee on Compound Semiconductor Devices and Circuits (Electron Device Society). He was an IEEE Electron Device Society Distinguished Lecturer from 2005 to 2012, and was an IEEE Nanotechnology Council Distinguished Lecturer in 2017 and 2018.

== Research ==
Bandyopadhyay has worked on spintronics, straintronics, nanoelectronics, nanosynthesis, electrochemical self-assembly, quantum dots and nanowires, hot carrier and quantum transport of charge in solids, spin based quantum computing and classical spin-based logic circuits, spin transport in nanostructures, and spin-based devices and general topics in spintronics.

Bandyopadhyay's most recent work has involved switching nanomagnets with electrically generated strain to produce energy-efficient digital information processing hardware. He worked in the field of hybrid spintronics and straintronics, His group harnessed straintronics to demonstrate an extreme sub-wavelength electromagnetic antenna that overcame the theoretical limits on antenna gain and efficiency and exceeded them by several orders of magnitude. He and his collaborators also conducted a study in 2021 to demonstrate resonant amplification of spin waves in a periodic two-dimensional interacting array of multiferroic nanomagnets which would have applications in magnonic devices.

== Awards and honors ==
- 2005–2012 - Distinguished Lecturer, IEEE Electron Devices Society
- 2004 - Fellow, Institute of Physics (UK)
- 2005 - Fellow, Institute of Electrical and Electronics Engineers (IEEE)
- 2005 - Fellow, The Electrochemical Society
- 2005 - Fellow, American Physical Society
- 2006 - Fellow, American Association for the Advancement of Science
- 2020 - IEEE Pioneer Award in Nanotechnology: For pioneering contributions to spintronics and straintronics employing nanostructures

== Selected articles ==
=== Books ===
- Supriyo Bandyopadhyay, ed, Quantum Dots and Nanowires (2003) ISBN 978-1588830135
- Physics of Nanostructured Solid State Devices (2012) ISBN 9781461411406
- Supriyo Bandyopadhyay and Marc Cahay, Introduction to Spintronics, Second edition (2015) ISBN 9781482255577
- Jayasimha Atulasimha and Supriyo Bandyopadhyay, eds, Nanomagnetic and Spintronic Devices for Energy-Efficient Memory and Computing (2016) ISBN 9781118869260
- Marc Cahay and Supriyo Bandyopadhyay, Problem Solving in Quantum Mechanics: From Basics to Real World Applications for Materials Scientists, Applied Physicists and Device Engineers (2017) ISBN 9781118988756
- Supriyo Bandyopadhyay, Marc Cahay, and Jean-Pierre Leburton, eds, Contemporary Topics in Semiconductor Spintronics (2017) ISBN 9789813149816
- Magnetic Straintronics (2024) ISBN 9783031206825
- Anjan Barman, Supriyo Bandyopadhyay, editors,Nanomagnets as Dynamical Systems (2024) ISBN 9783031731907

=== Articles ===
- Datta, S., Melloch, M. R., Bandyopadhyay, S., Noren, R., Vaziri, M., Miller, M., & Reifenberger, R. (1985) "Novel interference effects between parallel quantum wells", Physical Review Letters 55(21), 2344.
- Zeng, H., Zheng, M., Skomski, R., Sellmyer, D. J., Liu, Y., Menon, L., & Bandyopadhyay, S. (2000) "Magnetic properties of self-assembled Co nanowires of varying length and diameter", Journal of Applied Physics 87(9): 4718–4720.
- Zeng, H., Skomski, R., Menon, L., Liu, Y., Bandyopadhyay, S., & Sellmyer, D. J. (2002) "Structure and magnetic properties of ferromagnetic nanowires in self-assembled arrays", Physical Review B 65(13): 134426.
- Pramanik, S., Stefanita, C. G., Patibandla, S., Bandyopadhyay, S., Garre, K., Harth, N., & Cahay, M. (2007) "Observation of extremely long spin relaxation times in an organic nanowire spin valve", Nature Nanotechnology 2(4): 216–219.
- Roy, K., Bandyopadhyay, S., & Atulasimha, J. (2011) "Hybrid spintronics and straintronics: A magnetic technology for ultra low energy computing and signal processing", Applied Physics Letters 99(6): 063108.
