= Overfill =

Optical concept

In the fields of optics and photonics, overfill (or overfilling) refers to a condition where the cross-sectional area of an incident light beam is larger than the entrance aperture of an optical element or the target surface it is intended to illuminate. This results in a portion of the beam being truncated or "clipped" by the physical boundaries of the component. Overfill is a fundamental concept in the design of laser systems, microscopy, and fiber optics, where the balance between power efficiency and beam quality is critical.

== Physical principles ==
When a beam of light, typically a Gaussian beam from a laser source, encounters an aperture, its behavior is determined by the ratio of the beam diameter (w) to the aperture diameter (D).

=== Overfill vs. underfill ===
Overfill (w > D) occurs when the beam "spills over" the edges of the aperture. This ensures that the aperture is illuminated with the most intense, central portion of the Gaussian profile, leading to a more uniform intensity distribution across the opening. In contrast, underfill (w < D) occurs when the entire beam passes through the aperture without truncation. While this maximizes power throughput, the intensity profile remains Gaussian, which may not be ideal for applications requiring high uniformity.

== Applications ==
=== Laser scanning and printing ===
In polygon scanning systems or laser printers, overfilling the facets of the rotating mirror ensures that the reflected beam maintains a constant intensity regardless of the mirror's angular position. If the beam were to underfill the facet, then the edges of the scan might suffer from power drops or vignetting.

=== Confocal microscopy ===
In confocal laser scanning microscopy (CLSM), the back aperture of the objective lens is often overfilled. By overfilling the objective lens, the light behaves more like a plane wave entering the lens, producing the smallest possible diffraction-limited spot at the focal plane and maximizing the lateral resolution of the microscope.

=== Fiber optics ===
In fiber optic coupling, overfilling occurs when the numerical aperture (NA) or the core diameter of the source light exceeds that of the receiving fiber, resulting in an overfilled launch (OFL) condition. An OFL condition is often used in multi-mode fiber testing, in which all possible propagation modes within the fiber are excited, providing a "worst-case" scenario for attenuation and bandwidth measurements.

=== Consequences ===
While overfilling can improve uniformity and resolution, it introduces several tradeoffs. The most direct consequence is insertion loss. Since the light falling outside the aperture is blocked or absorbed, the total optical power transmitted through the system is reduced. Another consequence is the tendency to produce diffraction artifacts, typically in the form of diffraction rings (Airy disks). In high-precision imaging, these rings can manifest as noise, potentially reducing the contrast of the optical system. Finally, in high-power laser applications (such as laser cutting or medical surgery), the "lost" light that strikes the aperture housing is converted into heat. Without proper thermal management, this can lead to thermal expansion, misalignment, or damage to the optical hardware. This phenomenon, often referred to as thermal lensing or thermal blooming, occurs when the non-uniform heating of the optical assembly creates a gradient in the refractive index or physical curvature of the elements. In surgical contexts, this can result in the laser's cutting point moving unexpectedly, potentially causing unintended tissue damage.

== Mathematical representation ==
The fraction of power P_{trans} transmitted through a circular aperture of radius r for a Gaussian beam with a 1/e^{2} beam waist of w is given by
$$P_{\text{trans}} = P_{\text{total}} \left( 1 - e^{-2r^2/w^2} \right).$$
In an overfill condition where w is significantly larger than r, the transmitted power becomes a small fraction of the total, but the intensity profile within r approaches a constant:
$$\lim_{w \to \infty} I(r) = I_{\text{max}}.$$
