= Purcell effect =

Quantum phenomenon

The Purcell effect is the enhancement of a quantum system's spontaneous emission rate by its environment. In the 1940s Edward Mills Purcell discovered the enhancement of spontaneous emission rates of atoms when they are incorporated into a resonant cavity. In terms of quantum electrodynamics the Purcell effect is a consequence of enhancement (or decreasing) of local density of photonic states at the emitter position. It can also be considered as an interference effect. The oscillator radiates the wave which is reflected from the environment. In turn the reflection excites the oscillator either out of phase resulting in higher damping rate accompanied with the radiation enhancement or in phase with the oscillator mode leading to the radiation suppression.

For an emitter tuned to the fundamental mode of a cavity and placed at its center the magnitude of the enhancement is given by the Purcell factor

$$F_{\rm P} = \frac{3}{4\pi^2}\left(\frac{\lambda_{\rm free}}{n}\right)^3 \frac{Q}{V}\,,$$

where $\lambda_{\rm free}$ is the vacuum wavelength, $n$ is the refractive index of the cavity material (so $\lambda_{\rm free}/n$ is the wavelength inside the cavity), and $Q$ and $V$ are the cavity quality factor and mode volume, respectively.

== Heuristic derivation ==
One way of seeing why the Purcell effect arises is by using cavity quantum electrodynamics. Fermi's golden rule dictates that the transition rate for the atom–vacuum (or atom–cavity) system is proportional to the density of final states. In a cavity at resonance, the density of final states is enhanced (though the number of final states may not be). The Purcell factor is then just the ratio of the cavity density of states

$$\rho_{\rm c} = \frac{1}{V \Delta \nu}$$

to that of the free space density of states

$$\rho_{\rm f} = \frac{8\pi n^3 \nu^2}{c^3}\,.$$

Here, $\nu$ and $\Delta \nu$ are the resonance frequency and bandwidth, respectively. Using

$$Q = \frac{\nu}{\Delta \nu}\,,$$

one gets

$$\frac{\rho_{\rm c}}{\rho_{\rm f}}
= \frac{c^3}{8\pi n^3 \nu^2}\frac{Q}{\nu V}
= \frac{1}{8\pi} \left( \frac{\lambda_{\rm free}}{n} \right)^3 \frac{Q}{V} \,,$$

which is correct up to a numerical constant for high-$Q$ cavity (Hermitian) modes. For low-$Q$ modes (encountered, for instance, with plasmonic nanoresonators), the Purcell factor takes a slightly different form that accounts for the non-Hermitian character of such modes.

== In research ==
It has been predicted theoretically that a 'photonic' material environment can control the rate of radiative recombination of an embedded light source. A main research goal is the achievement of a material with a complete photonic bandgap: a range of frequencies in which no electromagnetic modes exist and all propagation directions are forbidden. At the frequencies of the photonic bandgap, spontaneous emission of light is completely inhibited. Fabrication of a material with a complete photonic bandgap is a huge scientific challenge. For this reason photonic materials are being extensively studied. Many different kinds of systems in which the rate of spontaneous emission is modified by the environment are reported, including cavities, two, and three-dimensional photonic bandgap materials.

Researchers at University of Rochester reported in 2023 that significant improvements in perovskite solar cell efficiency can be achieved by utilizing Purcell effect to extend the duration of photon induced electron-hole pairs spontaneous recombination time thus enabling them to reach the cell electrodes.

The Purcell effect can also be useful for modeling single-photon sources for quantum cryptography. Controlling the rate of spontaneous emission and thus raising the photon generation efficiency is a key requirement for quantum dot based single-photon sources.

Finally, it is important to mention that the Purcell effect can enhance not only radiative processes but also non-radiative transitions such as dipole-dipole interactions and scattering, which has been already observed experimentally, for the first time, for atoms and molecules.
