= Mode coupling =

In the term mode coupling, as used in physics and electrical engineering, the word "mode" refers to eigenmodes of an idealized, "unperturbed", linear system. The superposition principle says that eigenmodes of linear systems are independent of each other: it is possible to excite or to annihilate a specific mode without influencing any other mode; there is no dissipation. In most real systems, however, there is at least some perturbation that causes energy transfer between different modes. This perturbation, interpreted as an interaction between the modes, is what is called "mode coupling".

Important applications are:

- In fiber optics
- In lasers (compare mode-locking)
- In condensed-matter physics, critical slowing down can be described by a Coupled mode theory.

== See also ==
- Nonlinear optics
- Nonlinear acoustics
- Equilibrium mode distribution
