= Photonic crystal =

Periodic optical nanostructure that affects the motion of photons

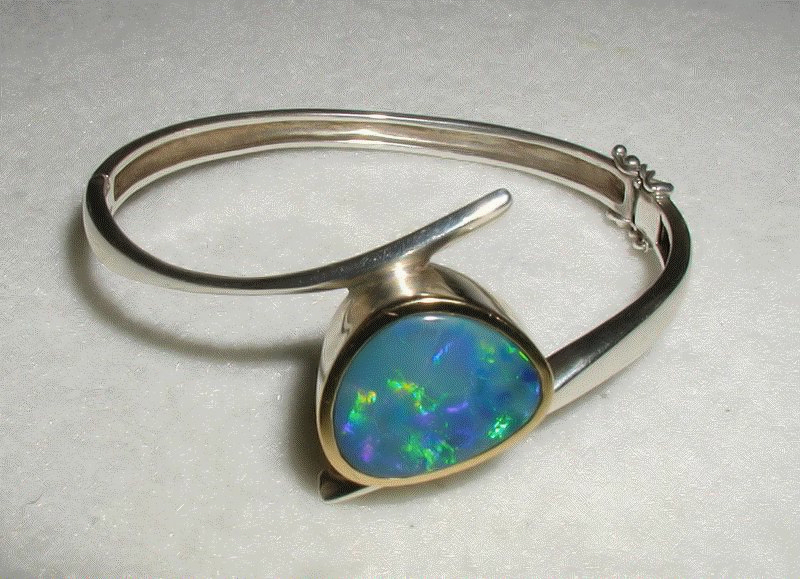
The opal in this bracelet contains a natural periodic microstructure responsible for its iridescent color. It is essentially a natural photonic crystal.

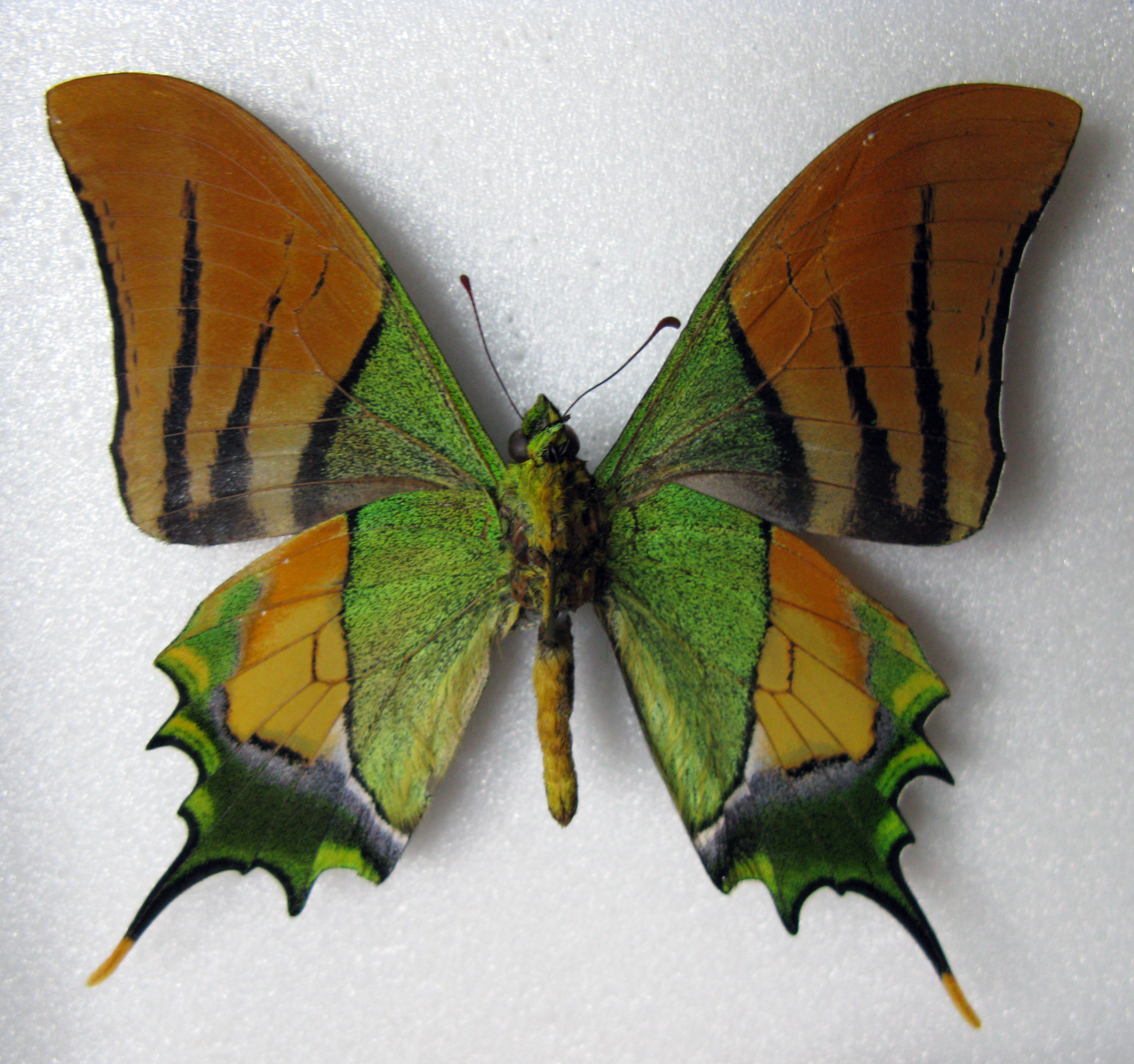
Wings of some butterflies, like this Teinopalpus imperialis, contain photonic crystals.

A photonic crystal is an optical nanostructure in which the refractive index changes periodically. This affects the propagation of light in the same way that the structure of natural crystals gives rise to X-ray diffraction and that the atomic lattices (crystal structure) of semiconductors affect their conductivity of electrons. Photonic crystals occur in nature in the form of structural coloration and animal reflectors, and, as artificially produced, promise to be useful in a range of applications.

Photonic crystals can be fabricated for one, two, or three dimensions. One-dimensional photonic crystals can be made of thin film layers deposited on each other. Two-dimensional ones can be made by photolithography, or by drilling holes in a suitable substrate. Fabrication methods for three-dimensional ones include drilling under different angles, stacking multiple 2-D layers on top of each other, direct laser writing, or, for example, instigating self-assembly of spheres in a matrix and dissolving the spheres.

Photonic crystals can, in principle, find uses wherever light must be manipulated. For example, dielectric mirrors are one-dimensional photonic crystals which can produce ultra-high reflectivity mirrors at a specified wavelength. Two-dimensional photonic crystals called photonic-crystal fibers are used for fiber-optic communication, among other applications. Three-dimensional crystals may one day be used in optical computers, and could lead to more efficient photovoltaic cells.

Although the energy of light (and all electromagnetic radiation) is quantized in units called photons, the analysis of photonic crystals requires only classical physics. "Photonic" in the name is a reference to photonics, a modern designation for the study of light (optics) and optical engineering. Indeed, the first research into what we now call photonic crystals may have been as early as 1887 when the English physicist Lord Rayleigh experimented with periodic multi-layer dielectric stacks, showing they can effect a photonic band-gap in one dimension. Research interest grew with work in 1987 by Eli Yablonovitch and Sajeev John on periodic optical structures with more than one dimension—now called photonic crystals.

== Introduction ==
Diffraction from a periodic structure as a function of incident wavelength. For some wavelength ranges, the wave is unable to penetrate the structure.

Photonic crystals are composed of periodic dielectric, metallo-dielectric—or even superconductor microstructures or nanostructures that affect electromagnetic wave propagation in the same way that the periodic potential in a semiconductor crystal affects the propagation of electrons, determining allowed and forbidden electronic energy bands. Photonic crystals contain regularly repeating regions of high and low refractive index. Light waves may propagate through this structure or propagation may be disallowed, depending on their wavelength. Wavelengths that may propagate in a given direction are called modes, and the ranges of wavelengths which propagate are called bands. Disallowed bands of wavelengths are called photonic band gaps. This gives rise to distinct optical phenomena, such as inhibition of spontaneous emission, high-reflecting omni-directional mirrors, and low-loss-waveguiding. The bandgap of photonic crystals can be understood as the destructive interference of multiple reflections of light propagating in the crystal at each interface between layers of high- and low- refractive index regions, akin to the bandgaps of electrons in solids.

There are two strategies for opening up the complete photonic band gap. The first one is to increase the refractive index contrast for the band gap in each direction becomes wider and the second one is to make the Brillouin zone more similar to sphere. However, the former is limited by the available technologies and materials and the latter is restricted by the crystallographic restriction theorem. For this reason, the photonic crystals with a complete band gap demonstrated to date have face-centered cubic lattice with the most spherical Brillouin zone and made of high-refractive-index semiconductor materials. Another approach is to exploit quasicrystalline structures with no crystallography limits. A complete photonic bandgap was reported for low-index polymer quasicrystalline samples manufactured by 3D printing.

The periodicity of the photonic crystal structure must be around or greater than half the wavelength (in the medium) of the light waves in order for interference effects to be exhibited. Visible light ranges in wavelength between about 400 nm (violet) to about 700 nm (red) and the resulting wavelength inside a material requires dividing that by the average index of refraction. The repeating regions of high and low dielectric constant must, therefore, be fabricated at this scale. In one dimension, this is routinely accomplished using the techniques of thin-film deposition.

== History ==
Photonic crystals have been studied in one form or another since 1887, but no one used the term photonic crystal until over 100 years later—after Eli Yablonovitch and Sajeev John published two milestone papers on photonic crystals in 1987. The early history is well-documented in the form of a story when it was identified as one of the landmark developments in physics by the American Physical Society.

Before 1987, one-dimensional photonic crystals in the form of periodic multi-layer dielectric stacks (such as the Bragg mirror) were studied extensively. Lord Rayleigh started their study in 1887, by showing that such systems have a one-dimensional photonic band-gap, a spectral range of large reflectivity, known as a stop-band. Today, such structures are used in a diverse range of applications—from reflective coatings to enhancing LED efficiency to highly reflective mirrors in certain laser cavities (see, for example, VCSEL). The pass-bands and stop-bands in photonic crystals were first reduced to practice by Melvin M. Weiner who called those crystals "discrete phase-ordered media." Weiner achieved those results by extending Darwin's dynamical theory for x-ray Bragg diffraction to arbitrary wavelengths, angles of incidence, and cases where the incident wavefront at a lattice plane is scattered appreciably in the forward-scattered direction. A detailed theoretical study of one-dimensional optical structures was performed by Vladimir P. Bykov, who was the first to investigate the effect of a photonic band-gap on the spontaneous emission from atoms and molecules embedded within the photonic structure. Bykov also speculated as to what could happen if two- or three-dimensional periodic optical structures were used. The concept of three-dimensional photonic crystals was then discussed by Ohtaka in 1979, who also developed a formalism for the calculation of the photonic band structure. However, these ideas did not take off until after the publication of two milestone papers in 1987 by Yablonovitch and John. Both these papers concerned high-dimensional periodic optical structures, i.e., photonic crystals. Yablonovitch's main goal was to engineer photonic density of states to control the spontaneous emission of materials embedded in the photonic crystal. John's idea was to use photonic crystals to affect localisation and control of light.

After 1987, the number of research papers concerning photonic crystals began to grow exponentially. However, due to the difficulty of fabricating these structures at optical scales (see Fabrication challenges), early studies were either theoretical or in the microwave regime, where photonic crystals can be built on the more accessible centimetre scale. (This fact is due to a property of the electromagnetic fields known as scale invariance. In essence, electromagnetic fields, as the solutions to Maxwell's equations, have no natural length scale—so solutions for centimetre scale structure at microwave frequencies are the same as for nanometre scale structures at optical frequencies.)

By 1991, Yablonovitch had demonstrated the first three-dimensional photonic band-gap in the microwave regime. The structure that Yablonovitch was able to produce involved drilling an array of holes in a transparent material, where the holes of each layer form an inverse diamond structure – today it is known as Yablonovite.

In 1996, Thomas Krauss demonstrated a two-dimensional photonic crystal at optical wavelengths. This opened the way to fabricate photonic crystals in semiconductor materials by borrowing methods from the semiconductor industry.

Pavel Cheben demonstrated a new type of photonic crystal waveguide – subwavelength grating (SWG) waveguide. The SWG waveguide operates in subwavelength region, away from the bandgap. It allows the waveguide properties to be controlled directly by the nanoscale engineering of the resulting metamaterial while mitigating wave interference effects. This provided "a missing degree of freedom in photonics" and resolved an important limitation in silicon photonics which was its restricted set of available materials insufficient to achieve complex optical on-chip functions.

Today, such techniques use photonic crystal slabs, which are two dimensional photonic crystals "etched" into slabs of semiconductor. Total internal reflection confines light to the slab, and allows photonic crystal effects, such as engineering photonic dispersion in the slab. Researchers around the world are looking for ways to use photonic crystal slabs in integrated computer chips, to improve optical processing of communications—both on-chip and between chips.

Autocloning fabrication technique, proposed for infrared and visible range photonic crystals by Sato et al. in 2002, uses electron-beam lithography and dry etching: lithographically formed layers of periodic grooves are stacked by regulated sputter deposition and etching, resulting in "stationary corrugations" and periodicity. Titanium dioxide/silica and tantalum pentoxide/silica devices were produced, exploiting their dispersion characteristics and suitability to sputter deposition.

Such techniques have yet to mature into commercial applications, but two-dimensional photonic crystals are commercially used in photonic crystal fibres (otherwise known as holey fibres, because of the air holes that run through them). Photonic crystal fibres were first developed by Philip Russell in 1998, and can be designed to possess enhanced properties over (normal) optical fibres.

Study has proceeded more slowly in three-dimensional than in two-dimensional photonic crystals. This is because of more difficult fabrication. Three-dimensional photonic crystal fabrication had no inheritable semiconductor industry techniques to draw on. Attempts have been made, however, to adapt some of the same techniques, and quite advanced examples have been demonstrated, for example in the construction of "woodpile" structures constructed on a planar layer-by-layer basis. Another strand of research has tried to construct three-dimensional photonic structures from self-assembly—essentially letting a mixture of dielectric nanospheres settle from solution into three-dimensionally periodic structures that have photonic band-gaps. Vasily Astratov's group from the Ioffe Institute realized in 1995 that natural and synthetic opals are photonic crystals with an incomplete bandgap. The first demonstration of an "inverse opal" structure with a complete photonic bandgap came in 2000, from researchers at the University of Toronto, and Institute of Materials Science of Madrid (ICMM-CSIC), Spain. The ever-expanding field of natural photonics, bioinspiration and biomimetics—the study of natural structures to better understand and use them in design—is also helping researchers in photonic crystals. For example, in 2006 a naturally occurring photonic crystal was discovered in the scales of a Brazilian beetle. Analogously, in 2012 a diamond crystal structure was found in a weevil and a gyroid-type architecture in a butterfly. More recently, gyroid photonic crystals have been found in the feather barbs of blue-winged leafbirds and are responsible for the bird's shimmery blue coloration. Some publications suggest the feasibility of the complete photonic band gap in the visible range in photonic crystals with optically saturated media that can be implemented by using laser light as an external optical pump.

== Construction strategies ==
The fabrication method depends on the number of dimensions that the photonic bandgap must exist in.

Examples of possible photonic crystal structures in 1, 2 and 3 dimensions

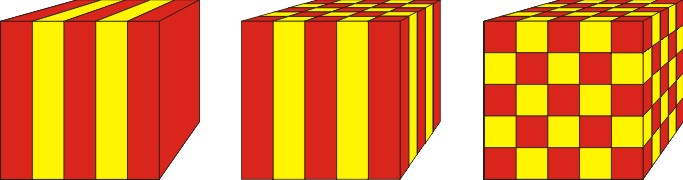
Comparison of 1D, 2D and 3D photonic crystal structures (from left to right, respectively)

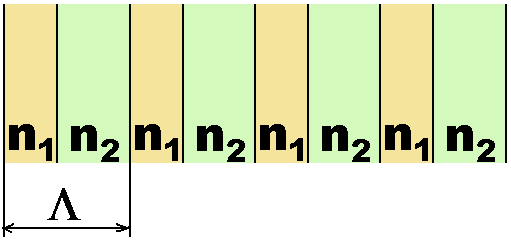
Schematic of a 1D photonic crystal structure, made of alternating layers of a high-dielectric constant material and a low-dielectric constant material. These layers are typically quarter wavelength in thickness.

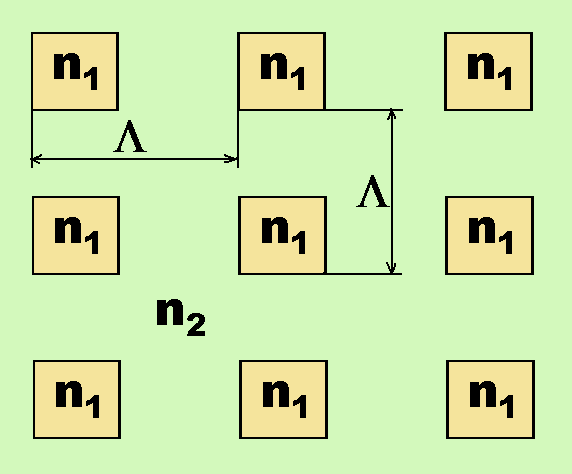
2D photonic crystal structure in a square array

Schematic of a 2D photonic crystal made of circular holes

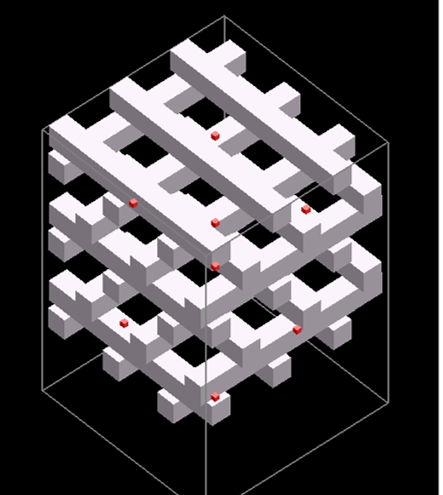
A woodpile structured 3D photonic crystal. These structures have a three-dimensional bandgap for all polarizations.

=== One-dimensional photonic crystals ===
To produce a one-dimensional photonic crystal, thin film layers of different dielectric constant may be periodically deposited on a surface which leads to a band gap in a particular propagation direction (such as normal to the surface). A Bragg grating is an example of this type of photonic crystal. One-dimensional photonic crystals can include layers of non-linear optical materials in which the non-linear behaviour is accentuated due to field enhancement at wavelengths near a so-called degenerate band edge. This field enhancement (in terms of intensity) can reach $N^2$ where N is the total number of layers. However, by using layers which include an optically anisotropic material, it has been shown that the field enhancement can reach $N^4$, which, in conjunction with non-linear optics, has potential applications such as in the development of an all-optical switch.

A one-dimensional photonic crystal can be implemented using repeated alternating layers of a metamaterial and vacuum. If the metamaterial is such that the relative permittivity and permeability follow the same wavelength dependence, then the photonic crystal behaves identically for TE and TM modes, that is, for both s and p polarizations of light incident at an angle.

Recently, researchers fabricated a graphene-based Bragg grating (one-dimensional photonic crystal) and demonstrated that it supports excitation of surface electromagnetic waves in the periodic structure by using 633 nm He-Ne laser as the light source. Besides, a novel type of one-dimensional graphene-dielectric photonic crystal has also been proposed. This structure can act as a far-IR filter and can support low-loss surface plasmons for waveguide and sensing applications. 1D photonic crystals doped with bio-active metals (i.e. silver) have been also proposed as sensing devices for bacterial contaminants. Similar planar 1D photonic crystals made of polymers have been used to detect volatile organic compounds vapors in atmosphere. In addition to solid-phase photonic crystals, some liquid crystals with defined ordering can demonstrate photonic color. For example, studies have shown several liquid crystals with short- or long-range one-dimensional positional ordering can form photonic structures.

=== Two-dimensional photonic crystals ===
In two dimensions, holes may be drilled in a substrate that is transparent to the wavelength of radiation that the bandgap is designed to block. Triangular and square lattices of holes have been successfully employed.

The Holey fiber or photonic crystal fiber can be made by taking cylindrical rods of glass in hexagonal lattice, and then heating and stretching them, the triangle-like airgaps between the glass rods become the holes that confine the modes.

=== Three-dimensional photonic crystals ===
There are several structure types that have been constructed:

- Spheres in a diamond lattice
- Yablonovite
- The woodpile structure – "rods" are repeatedly etched with beam lithography, filled in, and covered with a layer of new material. As the process repeats, the channels etched in each layer are perpendicular to the layer below, and parallel to and out of phase with the channels two layers below. The process repeats until the structure is of the desired height. The fill-in material is then dissolved using an agent that dissolves the fill-in material but not the deposition material. It is generally hard to introduce defects into this structure.
- Inverse opals or Inverse Colloidal Crystals-Spheres (such as polystyrene or silicon dioxide) can be allowed to deposit into a cubic close packed lattice suspended in a solvent. Then a hardener is introduced that makes a transparent solid out of the volume occupied by the solvent. The spheres are then dissolved with an acid such as Hydrochloric acid. The colloids can be either spherical or nonspherical. contains in excess of 750,000 polymer nanorods. Light focused on this beam splitter penetrates or is reflected, depending on polarization.

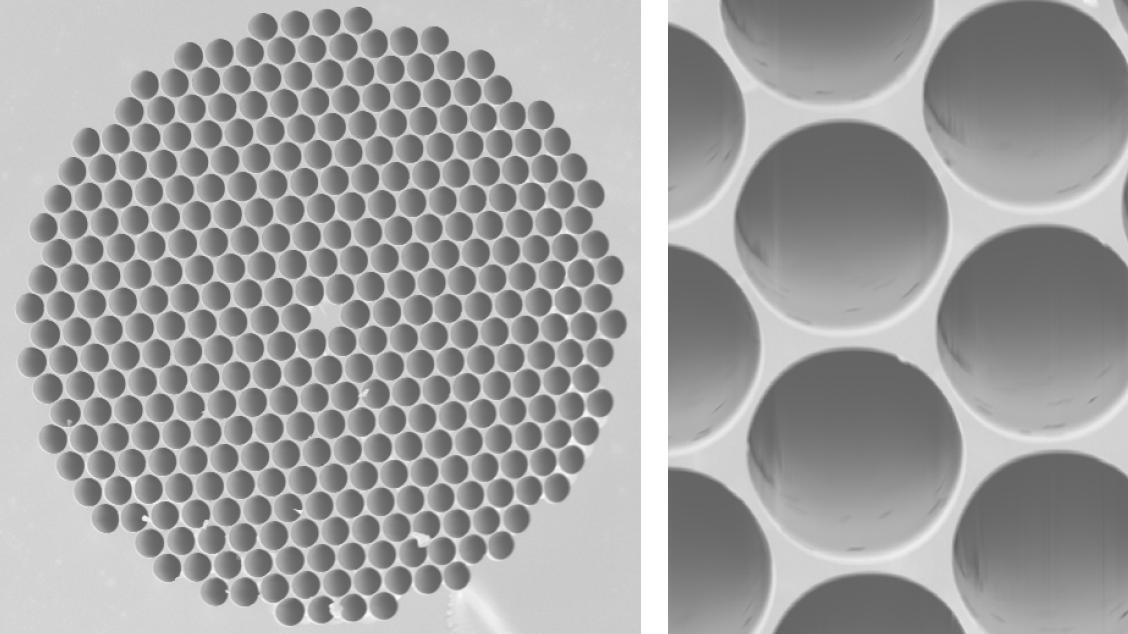
A photonic crystal fiber. SEM images of US NRL-produced fiber. (left) The diameter of the solid core at the center of the fiber is 5 μm, while (right) the diameter of the holes is 4 μm. Source:

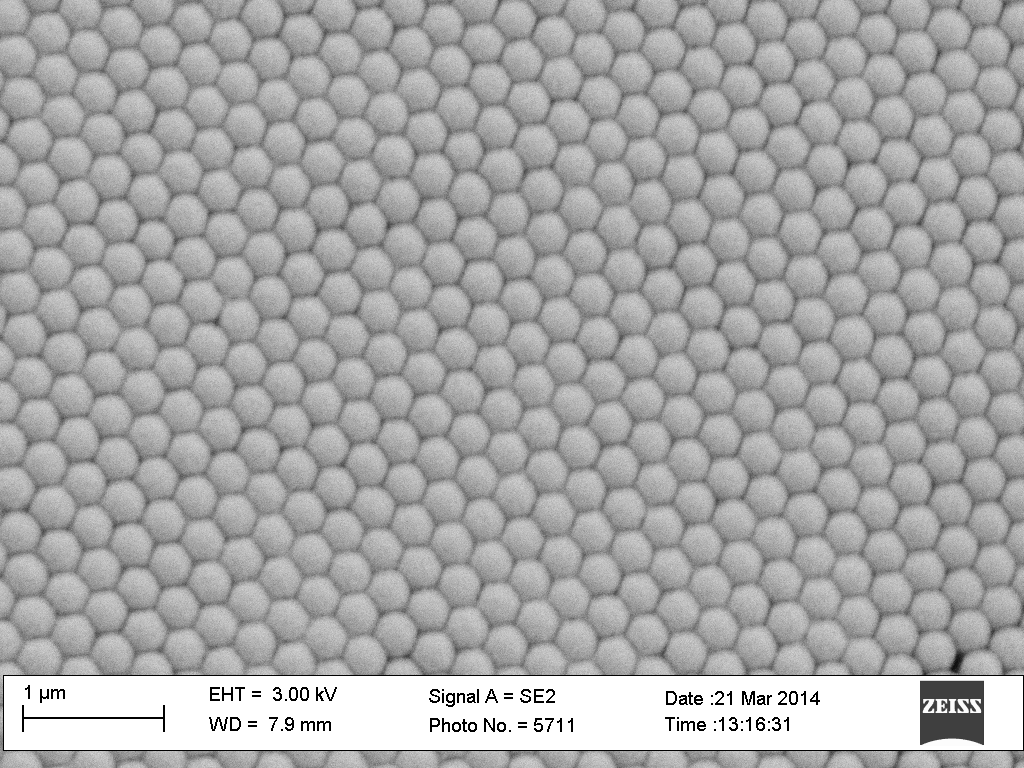
An SEM image of a self-assembled PMMA photonic crystal in two dimensions

=== Photonic crystal cavities ===
Not only band gap, photonic crystals may have another effect if we partially remove the symmetry through the creation a nanosize cavity. This defect allows you to guide or to trap the light with the same function as nanophotonic resonator and it is characterized by the strong dielectric modulation in the photonic crystals. For the waveguide, the propagation of light depends on the in-plane control provided by the photonic band gap and to the long confinement of light induced by dielectric mismatch. For the light trap, the light is strongly confined in the cavity resulting further interactions with the materials. First, if we put a pulse of light inside the cavity, it will be delayed by nano- or picoseconds and this is proportional to the quality factor of the cavity. Finally, if we put an emitter inside the cavity, the emission light also can be enhanced significantly and or even the resonant coupling can go through Rabi oscillation. This is related with cavity quantum electrodynamics and the interactions are defined by the weak and strong coupling of the emitter and the cavity. The first studies for the cavity in one-dimensional photonic slabs are usually in grating or distributed feedback structures. For two-dimensional photonic crystal cavities, they are useful to make efficient photonic devices in telecommunication applications as they can provide very high quality factor up to millions with smaller-than-wavelength mode volume. For three-dimensional photonic crystal cavities, several methods have been developed including lithographic layer-by-layer approach, surface ion beam lithography, and micromanipulation technique. All those mentioned photonic crystal cavities that tightly confine light offer very useful functionality for integrated photonic circuits, but it is challenging to produce them in a manner that allows them to be easily relocated. There is no full control with the cavity creation, the cavity location, and the emitter position relative to the maximum field of the cavity while the studies to solve those problems are still ongoing. Movable cavity of nanowire in photonic crystals is one of solutions to tailor this light matter interaction.

== Fabrication challenges ==
Higher-dimensional photonic crystal fabrication faces two major challenges:

- Making them with enough precision to prevent scattering losses blurring the crystal properties
- Designing processes that can robustly mass-produce the crystals

One promising fabrication method for two-dimensionally periodic photonic crystals is a photonic-crystal fiber, such as a holey fiber. Using fiber draw techniques developed for communications fiber it meets these two requirements, and photonic crystal fibres are commercially available. Another promising method for developing two-dimensional photonic crystals is the so-called photonic crystal slab. These structures consist of a slab of material—such as silicon—that can be patterned using techniques from the semiconductor industry. Such chips offer the potential to combine photonic processing with electronic processing on a single chip.

For three dimensional photonic crystals, various techniques have been used—including photolithography and etching techniques similar to those used for integrated circuits. Some of these techniques are already commercially available. To avoid the complex machinery of nanotechnological methods, some alternate approaches involve growing photonic crystals from colloidal crystals as self-assembled structures.

Mass-scale 3D photonic crystal films and fibres can now be produced using a shear-assembly technique that stacks 200–300 nm colloidal polymer spheres into perfect films of fcc lattice. Because the particles have a softer transparent rubber coating, the films can be stretched and molded, tuning the photonic bandgaps and producing striking structural color effects.

== Computing photonic band structure ==
The photonic band gap (PBG) is essentially the gap between the air-line and the dielectric-line in the dispersion relation of the PBG system. To design photonic crystal systems, it is essential to engineer the location and size of the bandgap by computational modeling using any of the following methods:

A video simulation of scattering forces and fields in a photonic crystal structure

- Plane wave expansion method
- Inverse dispersion method
- Finite element method
- Finite difference time domain method
- Order-n spectral method
- KKR method

Essentially, these methods solve for the frequencies (normal modes) of the photonic crystal for each value of the propagation direction given by the wave vector, or vice versa. The various lines in the band structure, correspond to the different cases of n, the band index. For an introduction to photonic band structure, see K. Sakoda's and Joannopoulos books. Various open-source software for calculating band diagrams were also published in the photonics literature, including MPB.

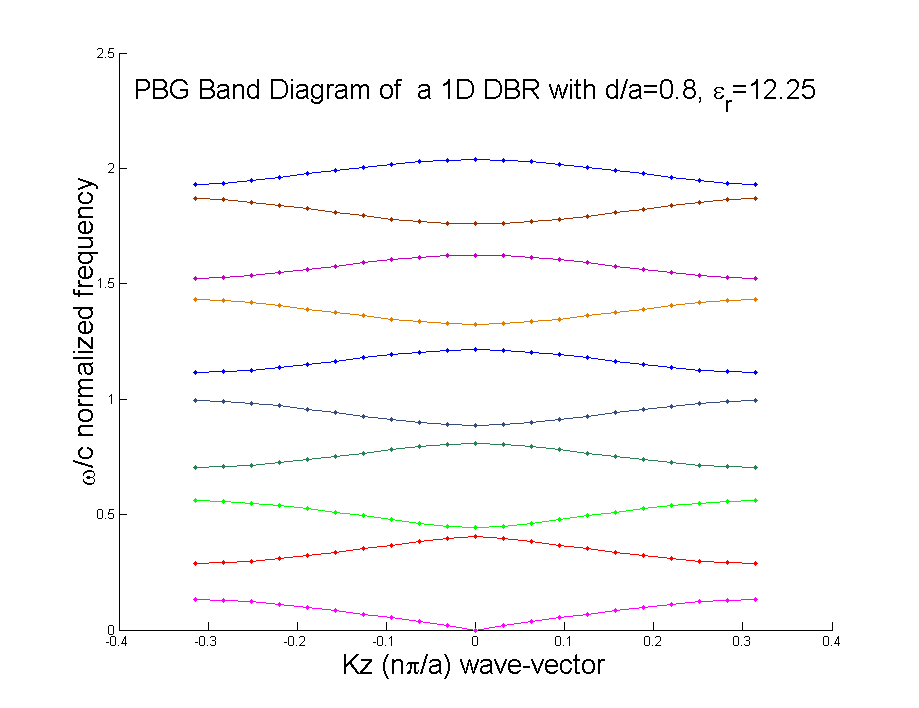
Band structure of a 1D photonic crystal, DBR air-core calculated using plane wave expansion technique with 101 planewaves, for d/a=0.8, and dielectric contrast of 12.250

The plane wave expansion method can be used to calculate the band structure using an eigen formulation of the Maxwell's equations, and thus solving for the eigenfrequencies for each of the propagation directions, of the wave vectors. It directly solves for the dispersion diagram. Electric field strength values can also be calculated over the spatial domain of the problem using the eigen vectors of the same problem. For the picture shown to the right, corresponds to the band-structure of a 1D distributed Bragg reflector (DBR) with air-core interleaved with a dielectric material of relative permittivity 12.25, and a lattice period to air-core thickness ratio (d/a) of 0.8, is solved using 101 planewaves over the first irreducible Brillouin zone. The Inverse dispersion method also exploited plane wave expansion but formulates Maxwell's equation as an eigenproblem for the wave vector k while the frequency $\omega$ is considered as a parameter. Thus, it solves the dispersion relation $k(\omega)$ instead of $\omega(k)$, which plane wave method does. The inverse dispersion method makes it possible to find complex value of the wave vector e.g. in the bandgap, which allows one to distinguish photonic crystals from metamaterial. Besides, the method is ready for the frequency dispersion of the permittivity to be taken into account.

To speed calculation of the frequency band structure, the Reduced Bloch Mode Expansion (RBME) method can be used. The RBME method applies "on top" of any of the primary expansion methods mentioned above. For large unit cell models, the RBME method can reduce time for computing the band structure by up to two orders of magnitude.

== Applications ==
Photonic crystals are attractive optical materials for controlling and manipulating light flow. One dimensional photonic crystals are already in widespread use, in the form of thin-film optics, with applications from low and high reflection coatings on lenses and mirrors to colour changing paints and inks. Higher-dimensional photonic crystals are of great interest for both fundamental and applied research, and the two dimensional ones are beginning to find commercial applications.

The first commercial products involving two-dimensionally periodic photonic crystals are already available in the form of photonic-crystal fibers, which use a microscale structure to confine light with radically different characteristics compared to conventional optical fiber for applications in nonlinear devices and guiding exotic wavelengths. The three-dimensional counterparts are still far from commercialization but may offer additional features such as optical nonlinearity required for the operation of optical transistors used in optical computers, when some technological aspects such as manufacturability and principal difficulties such as disorder are under control.

SWG photonic crystal waveguides have facilitated new integrated photonic devices for controlling transmission of light signals in photonic integrated circuits, including fibre-chip couplers, waveguide crossovers, wavelength and mode multiplexers, ultra-fast optical switches, athermal waveguides, biochemical sensors, polarization management circuits, broadband interference couplers, planar waveguide lenses, anisotropic waveguides, nanoantennas and optical phased arrays. SWG nanophotonic couplers permit highly-efficient and polarization-independent coupling between photonic chips and external devices. They have been adopted for fibre-chip coupling in volume optoelectronic chip manufacturing. These coupling interfaces are particularly important because every photonic chip needs to be optically connected with the external world and the chips themselves appear in many established and emerging applications, such as 5G networks, data center interconnects, chip-to-chip interconnects, metro- and long-haul telecommunication systems, and automotive navigation.

In addition to the foregoing, photonic crystals have been proposed as platforms for the development of solar cells and optical sensors, including chemical sensors and biosensors.

== See also ==
- Animal coloration – General appearance of an animal
- Animal reflectors
- Colloidal crystal – Ordered array of colloidal particles
- Left-handed material – Material with a negative refractive index
- Metamaterial – Materials engineered to have properties that have not yet been found in nature
- Nanomaterials – Materials with granular size 1 to 100 nm
- Nanotechnology – Technology with features near one nanometer
- Optical medium – Medium through which electromagnetic waves propagate
- Photonic-crystal fiber – Class of optical fiber based on the properties of photonic crystals
- Photonic metamaterials – Type of electromagnetic metamaterial
- Structural coloration – Colour in living creatures caused by interference effects
- Superlens – Type of transmissive optical device
- Superprism – Type of crystal
- Thin-film optics – Branch of optics
- Tunable metamaterials
