= Optical modulator =

Type of device

An optical modulator is a device which is used to modulate a beam of light; optical modulation is the activity of modulating beams of light in optical communication.

The beam may be carried over free space, or propagated through an optical waveguide (optical fibre). Depending on the parameter of a light beam that is manipulated, modulators may be categorized into amplitude modulators, phase modulators, polarization modulators, etc. The easiest way to obtain modulation of intensity of a light beam is to modulate the current driving the light source, e.g. a laser diode. This sort of modulation is called direct modulation, as opposed to the external modulation performed by a light modulator. For this reason, light modulators are, e.g. in fiber-optic communications, called external light modulators.

With laser diodes where narrow linewidth is required, direct modulation is avoided due to a high bandwidth "chirping" effect when applying and removing the current to the laser.

Optical modulators are used with superconductors which work properly only at low temperatures, generally just above absolute zero. Optical modulators convert information carried by an electric current in an electromagnet into light.

== Classification of optical modulators ==
According to the properties of the material that are used to modulate the light beam, modulators are divided into two groups: absorptive modulators and refractive modulators. In absorptive modulators the absorption coefficient of the material is changed, in refractive modulators the refractive index of the material is changed.

The absorption coefficient of the material in the modulator can be manipulated by the Franz–Keldysh effect, the Quantum-confined Stark effect, excitonic absorption, changes of Fermi level, or changes of free carrier concentration. Usually, if several such effects appear together, the modulator is called an electro-absorptive modulator.

Refractive modulators most often make use of an electro-optic effect. Some modulators utilize an acousto-optic effect or magneto-optic effect or take advantage of polarization changes in liquid crystals. The refractive modulators are named by the respective effect: i.e. electrooptic modulators, acousto-optic modulators etc. The effect of a refractive modulator of any of the types mentioned above is to change the phase of a light beam. The phase modulation can be converted into amplitude modulation using an interferometer or directional coupler.

Separate case of modulators are spatial light modulators (SLMs). The role of SLM is modification two dimensional distribution of amplitude and/or phase of an optical wave.

== See also ==
- Acousto-optic modulator
- Electro-absorption modulator
- Electro-optic modulator, exploiting the electro-optic effect
