= Integrated quantum photonics =

Photonics to control quantum states

Integrated quantum photonics, uses photonic integrated circuits to control photonic quantum states for applications in quantum technologies. As such, integrated quantum photonics provides a promising approach to the miniaturisation and scaling up of optical quantum circuits. The major application of integrated quantum photonics is Quantum technology:, for example quantum computing, quantum communication, quantum simulation, quantum walks and quantum metrology.

== History ==
Linear optics was not seen as a potential technology platform for quantum computation until the seminal work of Knill, Laflamme, and Milburn, which demonstrated the feasibility of linear optical quantum computers using detection and feed-forward to produce deterministic two-qubit gates. Following this there were several experimental proof-of-principle demonstrations of two-qubit gates performed in bulk optics. It soon became clear that integrated optics could provide a powerful enabling technology for this emerging field. Early experiments in integrated optics demonstrated the feasibility of the field via demonstrations of high-visibility non-classical and classical interference. Typically, linear optical components such as directional couplers (which act as beamsplitters between waveguide modes), and phase shifters to form nested Mach–Zehnder interferometers are used to encode a qubit in the spatial degree of freedom. That is, a single photon is in superposition between two waveguides, where the zero and one states of the qubit correspond to the photon's presence in one or the other waveguide. These basic components are combined to produce more complex structures, such as entangling gates and reconfigurable quantum circuits. Reconfigurability is achieved by tuning the phase shifters, which are manipulated by using thermo- or electro-optical elements.

Another area of research in which integrated optics will prove pivotal is Quantum communication and has been marked by extensive experimental development demonstrating, for example, quantum key distribution (QKD), quantum relays based on entanglement swapping, and quantum repeaters.

Since the birth of integrated quantum optics experiments have ranged from technological demonstrations, for example integrated single photon sources and integrated single photon detectors, to fundamental tests of nature, new methods for quantum key distribution, and the generation of new quantum states of light. It has also been demonstrated that a single reconfigurable integrated device is sufficient to implement the full field of linear optics, by using a reconfigurable universal interferometer.

As the field has progressed new quantum algorithms have been developed which provide short and long term routes towards the demonstration of the superiority of quantum computers over their classical counterparts. Cluster state quantum computation is now generally accepted as the approach that will be used to develop a fully fledged quantum computer. Whilst development of quantum computer will require the synthesis of many aspects of integrated optics, boson sampling seeks to demonstrate the power of quantum information processing via readily available technologies and is therefore a very promising near term algorithm for doing so. In fact, shortly after its introduction, there were several small scale experimental demonstrations of the effectiveness of the boson sampling algorithm

== Introduction ==
Quantum photonics is the science of generating, manipulating and detecting light in regimes where it's possible to coherently control individual quanta of the light field (photons). Historically, quantum photonics has been fundamental to exploring quantum phenomena, for example with the EPR paradox and Bell test experiments,. Quantum photonics is also expected to play a central role in advancing future technologies, such as Quantum computing, Quantum key distribution and Quantum metrology. Photons are particularly attractive carriers of quantum information due to their low decoherence properties, light-speed transmission and ease of manipulation. Quantum photonics experiments traditionally involved 'bulk optics' technology—individual optical components (lenses, beamsplitters, etc.) mounted on a large optical table, with a combined mass of hundreds of kilograms.

The application of Integrated quantum photonic circuits to quantum photonics, is seen as an important step in developing useful quantum technology. Single die photonic circuits offer the following advantages over bulk optics:

1. Miniaturisation - Size, weight, and power consumption are reduced by orders of magnitude by virtue of smaller system size.
2. Stability - Miniaturised components produced with advanced lithographic techniques produce waveguides and components which are inherently phase stable (coherent) and do not require optical alignment
3. Experiment size - Large numbers of optical components can be integrated into a device measuring a few square centimeters.
4. Manufacturability - Devices can be manufactured in large volumes at much lower cost.

Being based on well-developed fabrication techniques, the elements employed in Integrated Quantum Photonics are more readily miniaturisable, and products based on this approach can be manufactured using existing production processes and methods.

== Materials ==
Control over photons can be achieved with integrated devices that can be realised in diverse material substrates such as silica, silicon, gallium arsenide, lithium niobate and indium phosphide and silicon nitride.

=== Silica ===
Three methods for using silica:

1. Flame hydrolysis.
2. Photolithography.
3. Direct write - uses a single material and laser (a computer controlled laser "damages" the glass by manipulating the laser focus and path to create circuit lines by altering the refractive index of the material along that path, thereby producing waveguides). This method has the benefit of not needing a clean room and is the most common method now for making silica waveguides. It's also excellent for rapid prototyping and has been used to advantage in several demonstrations of topological photonics.

The main challenges of the silica platform are the low refractive index contrast, the lack of active tunability post-fabrication (as opposed to all the other substrates) and the difficulty of mass production with reproducibility and high yield due to the serial nature of the inscription process.

=== Silicon ===
A big advantage of using silicon is that the circuits can be tuned actively using integrated thermal microheaters or p-i-n modulators, after the devices have been fabricated. The other big benefit of silicon is its compatibility with CMOS technology, which allows leveraging the mature fabrication infrastructure of the semiconductor electronics industry. The structures differ from modern electronic ones, however, as they are readily scalable. Silicon has a really high refractive index of ~3.5 at the 1550 nm wavelength commonly used in optical telecommunications. It therefore offers one of the highest component densities in integrated photonics. The large contrast in refractive index with glass (1.44) allows waveguides formed of silicon surrounded by glass to have very tight bends, which allows for a high component density and reduced system size. Large silicon-on-insulator (SOI) wafers up to 300 mm in diameter can be obtained commercially, making the technology both available and reproducible. Many of the largest systems (up to several hundred components) have been demonstrated on the silicon photonics platform, with up to eight simultaneous photons, generation of graph states (cluster states), and up to 15 dimensional qubits). Photon sources in silicon waveguide circuits leverage silicon's third-order nonlinearity to produce pairs of photons in spontaneous four-wave mixing. Silicon is opaque for wavelengths of light below ~1200 nm, limiting applicability to infrared photons. Phase modulators based on thermo-optic and electro-optic phases are characteristically slow (KHz) and lossy (several dB) respectively, limiting applications and the ability to perform feed-forward measurements for quantum computation.

=== Lithium Niobate ===
Lithium niobate offers a large second-order optical nonlinearity, enabling generation of photon pairs via spontaneous parametric down-conversion. This can also be leveraged to manipulate phase and perform mode conversion at high speeds, and offers a promising route to feed-forward for quantum computation, multiplexed (deterministic) single photons sources). Historically, waveguides are defined using titanium in-diffusion, resulting in large waveguides (large mode size and bend radius). A newly developed platform known as thin-film lithium niobate (TFLN), or lithium niobate on insulator (LNOI), which relies on nano-fabrication process including UV maskless lithography or electron-beam lithography to define waveguides, has realised nano-scale feature size and high performance quantum photonics devices.

=== III-V Materials on Insulator ===
Photonic waveguides made from group III-V materials on insulator, such as (Al)GaAs and InP, provide some of the largest second and third order nonlinearities, large refractive index contrast providing large modal confinement, and wide optical bandgaps resulting in negligible two-photon absorption at telecommunications wavelengths. III-V materials are capable of low-loss passive and high-speed active components, such as active gain for on-chip lasers, high-speed electro-optic modulators (Pockels and Kerr effects), and on-chip detectors. Compared to other materials such as silica, silicon, and silicon nitride, the large optical nonlinearity, simultaneously with low waveguide loss and tight modal confinement, has resulted in ultrabright entangled-photon pair generation from microring resonators.

== Fabrication ==
Conventional fabrication technologies are based on photolithographic processes, which enable strong miniaturisation and mass production. In quantum optics applications a relevant role has also been played by the direct inscription of the circuits by femtosecond lasers or UV lasers; these are low-volume fabrication technologies, which are particularly convenient for research purposes where novel designs have to be tested with rapid fabrication turnaround.

However, laser-written waveguides are not suitable for mass production and miniaturisation due to the serial nature of the inscription technique, and due to the very low refractive index contrast allowed by these materials, as opposed to silicon photonic circuits. Femtosecond laser-written quantum circuits have proven particularly suited for the manipulation of the polarisation degree of freedom and for building circuits with innovative three-dimensional designs. Quantum information is encoded on-chip in either the path, polarisation, time bin, or frequency state of the photon and manipulated using active integrated components in a compact and stable manner.

== Components ==
Though the same fundamental components are used in quantum as classical photonic integrated circuits, there are also some practical differences. Since amplification of single photon quantum states is not possible (no-cloning theorem), loss is the top priority in components in quantum photonics.

Single photon sources are built from building blocks (waveguides, directional couplers, phase shifters). Typically, optical ring resonators, and long waveguide sections provide increased nonlinear interaction for photon pair generation, though progress is also being made to integrate solid state systems single photon sources based on quantum dots, and nitrogen-vacancy centers with waveguide photonic circuits.

== See also ==
- Linear optical quantum computing
- Quantum information
- Quantum key distribution
- List of companies involved in quantum computing or communication
- List of quantum processors
