= Electro-absorption modulator =

Device used for modulating a laser beam

An electro-absorption modulator (EAM) is a semiconductor device which can be used for modulating the intensity of a laser beam via an electric voltage. Its principle of operation is based on the Franz–Keldysh effect, i.e., a change in the absorption spectrum caused by an applied electric field, which changes the bandgap energy (thus the photon energy of an absorption edge) but usually does not involve the excitation of carriers by the electric field.

For modulators in telecommunications, small size and modulation voltages are desired. The EAM is candidate for use in external modulation links in telecommunications. These modulators can be realized using either bulk semiconductor materials or materials with multiple quantum dots or wells.

Most EAMs are made in the form of a waveguide with electrodes for applying an electric field in a direction perpendicular to the modulated light beam. For achieving a high extinction ratio, one usually exploits the Quantum-confined Stark effect (QCSE) in a quantum well structure.

Compared with an Electro-optic modulator (EOM), an EAM can operate with much lower voltages (a few volts instead of ten volts or more). They can be operated at very high speed; a modulation bandwidth of tens of gigahertz can be achieved, which makes these devices useful for optical fiber communication. A convenient feature is that an EAM can be integrated with distributed feedback laser diode on a single chip to form a data transmitter in the form of a photonic integrated circuit. Compared with direct modulation of the laser diode, a higher bandwidth and reduced chirp can be obtained.

Semiconductor quantum well EAM is widely used to modulate near-infrared (NIR) radiation at frequencies below 0.1 THz. Here, the NIR absorption of undoped quantum well was modulated by strong electric field with frequencies between 1.5 and 3.9 THz. The THz field coupled two excited states (excitons) of the quantum wells, as manifested by a new THz frequency-and power- dependent NIR absorption line. The THz field generated a coherent quantum superposition of an absorbing and a nonabsorbing exciton. This quantum coherence may yield new applications for quantum well modulators in optical communications.

Recently, advances in crystal growth have triggered the study of self organized quantum dots. Since the EAM requires small size and low modulation voltages, possibility of obtaining quantum dots with enhanced electro-absorption coefficients makes them attractive for such application.

== See also ==
- Optical modulator
- Electro-optic modulator
