= Industrial Electronic Engineers =

American electronics company

Industrial Electronic Engineers, Inc.
- Trade name: IEE
- Type: Private
- Industry: Electronics
- Founded: 1946; 80 years ago in Van Nuys, California
- Founder: Donald Gumpertz
- Products: Electronic displays
- Number of employees: 100 (2009)
- Website: ieeinc.com

Industrial Electronic Engineers, Inc. (IEE; sometimes spelled Industrial Electronics Engineers) is an American electronics company based in Van Nuys, California.

It was founded by Donald Gumpertz in 1946. The company is best known for its electronic displays, becoming a pioneer in the field under Gumpertz's leadership. In the mid-1950s, the company developed the first automated pharmacy warehouse system, and it later produced rear-projection electronic numeric displays, computer and data terminal keyboards, and switches.

== History ==
=== Early history ===
Industrial Electronic Engineers was founded in 1946 by Donald Gumpertz (June 22, 1918, in Oxnard, California – April 28, 2012, in Toluca Lake, California). Gumpertz had been interested in electronics from a young age, building a ham radio transceiver at the age of 14 and obtaining an unrestricted commercial operator's licence from the Federal Radio Commission (the predecessor to the FCC) at 15 in the early 1930s. Before founding IEE, Gumpertz worked as an engineer at and announcer for Santa Barbara's KDB and Berkeley's KRE.

One of IEE's first products to market was an electronic numeric display unit that worked from a rear-projection principle, in which several miniature lightbulbs arranged in a grid pattern shine one at a time through a black-and-white film etched with digits, along with two sets of condenser lenses for evening the lighting—both in a corresponding arrangement to the bulbs. The projected digit is then sent through a projection lens that centers each projected digit onto a frosted glass screen facing the viewer. This display unit was developed in the 1950s. One of the first bulk purchasers was Cohu, a manufacturer of test equipment who used it in their digital voltmeters in 1958.

=== Automatic warehouse system ===
In the mid-1950s Gumpertz and his company developed the system for an automated pharmacy warehouse for the Brunswig Drug Company of Los Angeles—the first of its kind.

The system comprised a number of chutes loaded with the Brunswig's items, each of which were packaged in a standardized shape—dubbed "cartridges"—which were loaded manually by the warehouse workers. Retailers carrying Brunswig's items, which in 1957 was numbered to be roughly 2,000, had a dedicated area for their products, in which sample units of these products were on display. Customers were given a blank card on entering the area, which they would insert into printers housed underneath the products on display, each insertion leading to one virtual "selection" of a product. More than one selection of a product required multiple insertions; customers could cancel any selection by crossing out the item on the card with a pencil.

When a purchase was completed, the card was given to a cashier, who fed it into an electronic reader connected via a modem to Brunswig's central warehouse. A mainframe in the warehouse processed the order data, sorting the transactions by item, updating the records of available stock, and printing advice notes and warnings of low stock to the warehouse managers, if necessary. After the transactions were sorted, the mainframe controlled solenoid gates at the end of each chute, opening the appropriate gate for each item ordered. Items were dropped from each gate once per second; the mainframe could open the gates for up to ten unique items per second, or 100 varying items every 15 seconds in a best-case scenario. The items were dropped onto conveyor belts in front of the chutes, all of which converged into a larger conveyor belt at appropriate intervals to separate each customer's order on the belt. This belt terminated into a box of fixed size which contained the customer's selection of Brunswig's products. The case was then dispatched to the customer at the store by truck.

IEE finished developing the system for Brunswig in 1957. It proved successful at first; only one malfunction was reported in the first 18 months, leading to downtime of only 10 minutes. Solartron–John Brown Automation Ltd. of the United Kingdom, who intended to market the system to supermarkets, acquired the rights to manufacture and market the machine outside the United States. However, Brunswig encountered increasing road traffic in Los Angeles in the early 1960s, as a result of customers moving to the outskirts of the city and shopping at more remote stores. The time from order to delivery slowed as result of the road traffic, so Brunswig raised non-automated warehouses closer to the outskirts where their customers were starting to shop. This decentralization reduced the throughput of the central automated warehouse to the point it became a white elephant for Brunswig and had to be shut down in 1963.

=== Bina-View and nimo tube ===
In January 1961, IEE released the Bina-View, an electronic alphanumeric display unit that accepts any alphanumeric BCD input from a 10 mw or higher signal to display a character 3.25 in high by 1.75 in wide, in an assembly 6.75 in long and weighing roughly 2 lb.

The Bina-View works by having plates punched with a checkerboard grid of holes arranged in a stack behind a lightbulb; the plate in the front is a "blanking plate" with its holes of a fixed size, while the plates behind it have holes punched larger where light will shine through to represent a picture element of the specific character. The unit's home position puts all plates in a straight line to let light shine through all holes at once. To blank out the screen, the front blanking plate is nudged down by a blade below the plate, the land of the plate obstructing the light passing behind it. When a character is selected, its corresponding plate is nudged down, while all other plates are in their home position and let light through. The land around the holes not representing a picture element of the selected character plate interferes with the light behind the plate, while the land around the larger holes that do represent a picture element is too small to completely block light passing behind the plate. The permitted light passes through the holes of the plates in front of the selected character plate (in their home position), and the result is a character visible from the front of the display. Specific plates are able to be nudged down by a system of notches on the bottom of each plate. A lifting bar is actuated when a "set pulse" is sent to the unit indicating a character is about to be chosen, while selector blades pivot in one of two directions to fit into the notches of the selected character, so that only the selected character plate is nudged down into view. Walter H. Buchsbaum of Electronics World called the design ingenious but noted that its complexity rendered user serviceability improbable.

An animation of a single-digit nimo tube display the numbers 0–9

In March 1967, IEE introduced another numeric display unit that is in essence a miniature cathode-ray tube. The tube has ten electron guns in two rows of five, each pointed to number-shaped stencils on a mask; when a number is selected, one of the guns fires through the corresponding stencil, onto the phosphor-coated glass screen on the face of the tube. This display, later named the nimo tube, was described by Electronic Design as "fairly simple" compared to other CRT-based digital display solutions due to the lack of a need for a deflection yoke. Electronic Equipment Engineering called it an advancement of their rear-projection displays. The anode required 2 (or 2.5) kV for operation but only about 30 µA of current; IEE sold the power supplies separately. Suggested applications of the tube in 1967 included voltmeters, digital counters, and cockpit readouts. Only tubes with a green (P31) phosphor were available at launch; purchasers could later choose any phosphor they desired.

The nimo tube directly competed against Burroughs Corporation's Nixie tube. Advantages of the nimo tube were its wider viewing angle compared to the Nixie tube and ability to control the anode brightness easily. Disadvantages were complexity of supplying power to the filament and anode—the latter requiring high voltage—and price: quantities of 1 to 9 nimo tubes commanded $20 each, more than double the cost of a Nixie tube of equivalent height. To make the nimo tube more competitive, IEE developed a 6-digit version in September 1967, with a ten digit version under development in November 1968. Both were made rectangular in shape, compared to the single-digit unit's round profile, and made use of an external deflection yoke allowing each gun to sweep horizontally in order to produce more than one digit.

=== Later history ===
IEE's Van Nuys factory employed over 400 people in the 1970s. By the late 1980s, the company was known for producing computer and data terminal keyboards and switches, in addition to displays. William E. Hartman ascended to presidency and the role of chief executive in 1985. In 1990, Gumpertz stepped down as president of IEE while remaining chairman; Stanley K. Weissberg of Resdel Corporation was named the new president.

IEE was hit hard by downsizing of the defense sector from 1990 to 1991, leading to a reduction of its 400-strong workforce by half by 1995 and a 10-percent pay cut for its remaining employees during the first four years of the downturn. Starting in 1992, the company eased into the commercial industry, producing video monitors and cash registers displays. In 1994, the company manufactured back-of-seat displays for the Metropolitan Opera, intended as an alternative to paper librettos in providing subtitles for patrons of operas. These subtitle displays made their debut in March 1995. In June 1995, under an initiative by Bill Clinton, the Department of Commerce gave IEE a $250,000 loan to help the company convert to the production of consumer products. In 2002, the company was in the business of fitting active-matrix LCDs with Clarex DR-IIIC, a light-diffusing acrylic that made the panels suitable for outdoor viewing.

The company posted sales of $20,000,000 in 2008. Gumpertz remained chairman of IEE until his death at the age of 92 in 2012. He worked two days out of the week in his final years.

In 2021, the company won a $15.3 million Department of Defense contract for replacing the Passive Attack Displays of the McDonnell Douglas F-15 Eagle.
