= Digital planar holography =

DPH Devices: A DPH structure (left) and a nano-spectrometer hologram for the visible band (right). (Pictures from the NOD website)

Digital planar holography (DPH) is a method for designing and fabricating miniature components for integrated optics. It was invented by Vladimir Yankov and first published in 2003. The essence of the DPH technology is embedding computer designed digital holograms inside a planar waveguide. Light propagates through the plane of the hologram instead of perpendicularly, allowing for a long interaction path. Benefits of a long interaction path have long been used by volume or thick holograms. Planar configuration of the hologram provider for easier access to the embedded diagram aiding in its manufacture.

Light can be confined in waveguides by a refractive index gradient. Light propagates in a core layer, surrounded by a cladding layer(s), which should be selected such that the core refractive index N_{core} is greater than that of cladding N_{clad}: N_{core}> N_{clad}. Cylindrical waveguides (optical fibers) allow for one-dimensional light propagation along the axis. Planar waveguides, fabricated by sequential depositing flat layers of transparent materials with a proper refractive index gradient on a standard wafer, confine light in one direction (z axis) and permit free propagation in two others (x and y axes).

Light waves propagating in the core infiltrate both cladding layers to a small degree. If the refractive index is modulated in the wave path, light of each given wavelength can be directed to the desired point.

The DPH technology, or Yankov hologram, comprises design and fabrication of the holographic nano-structures inside a planar waveguide, providing light processing and control. There are many ways of modulating the core refractive index, the simplest of which is engraving the required pattern by nanolithography means. The modulation is created by embedding a digital hologram on the lower or upper core surface or on the both of them. According to NOD (Nano-Optic Devices, LLC (NOD)) statement, standard lithographical processes can be used, making mass production straightforward and inexpensive. Nanoimprinting could be another viable method of fabricating DPH patterns.

Each DPH pattern is customized for a given application and computer-generated. It consists of numerous nano-grooves, each about 100 nm wide, positioned in a way, providing maximum efficiency for a specific application.

The devices are fabricated on standard wafers; one of typical devices is presented below (from the NOD web site). While the total number of nano-grooves is huge (≥10^{6}), a typical device size of DPH devices is on the millimeter scale. The small footprint of the DPH makes it possible to combine with other elements of photonic integrated circuits, such as coarse demultiplexers and interferometers.

Nano-Optic Devices, LLC (NOD) developed the DPH technology and applied it for commercializing nano-spectrometers. There are additional numerous applications for the DPH in integrated optics. Note, that DPH can be made from identical pixels,[5].
