= IN-9 =

IN-9, IN 9, or IN9 may refer to:

- Indiana's 9th congressional district
- Indiana State Road 9
- IN-9 (Vacuum tube display), a kind of long nixie tube containing a single cathode
