= Lightguide display =

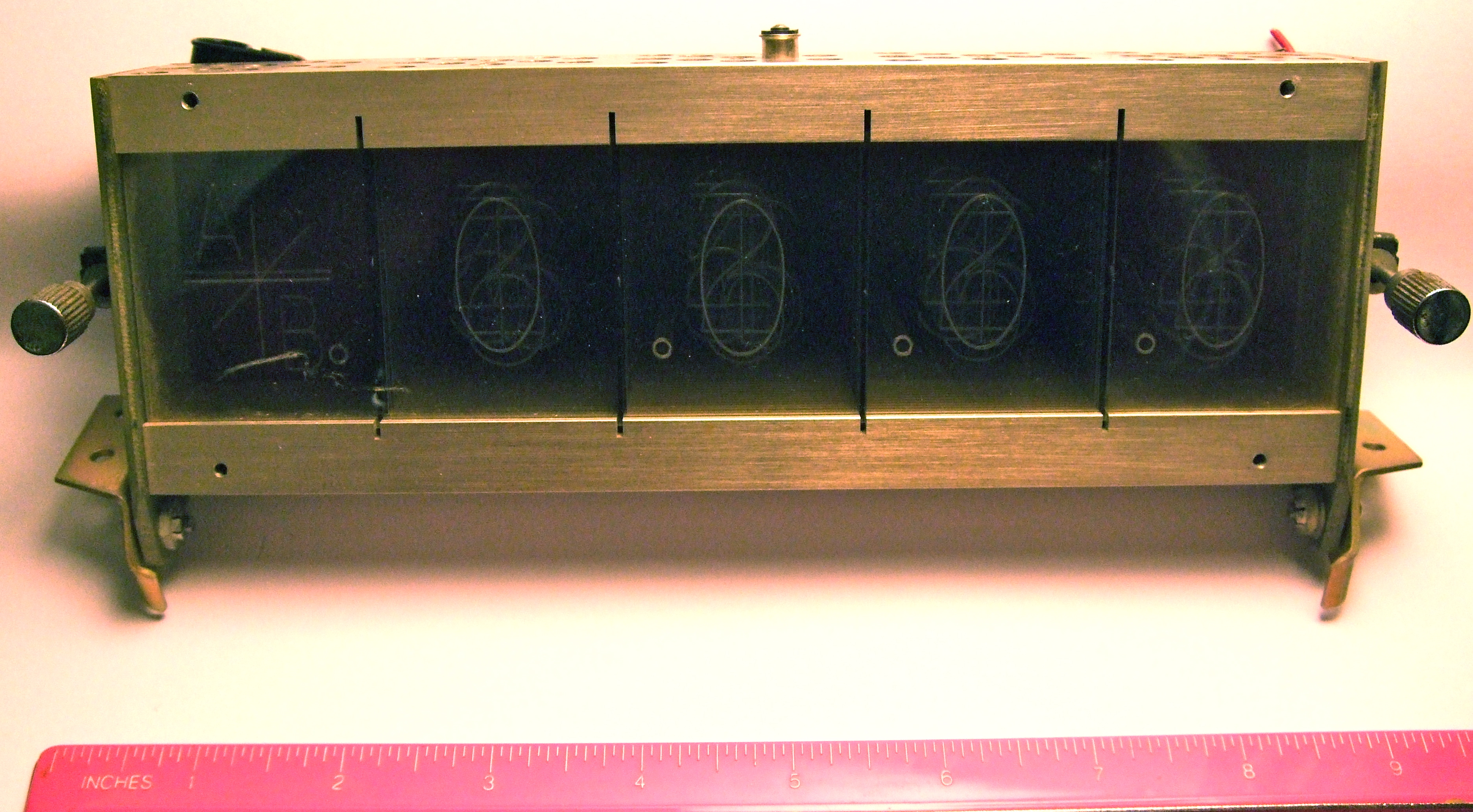
A lightguide (edge-lit) display.

A Lightguide display (also known as an edge-lit display) is an obsolete electronic mechanism which was used for displaying alphanumeric characters in electronic devices such as calculators, multimeters, laboratory measurement instruments, and entertainment machines such as pinball games.

== Construction ==
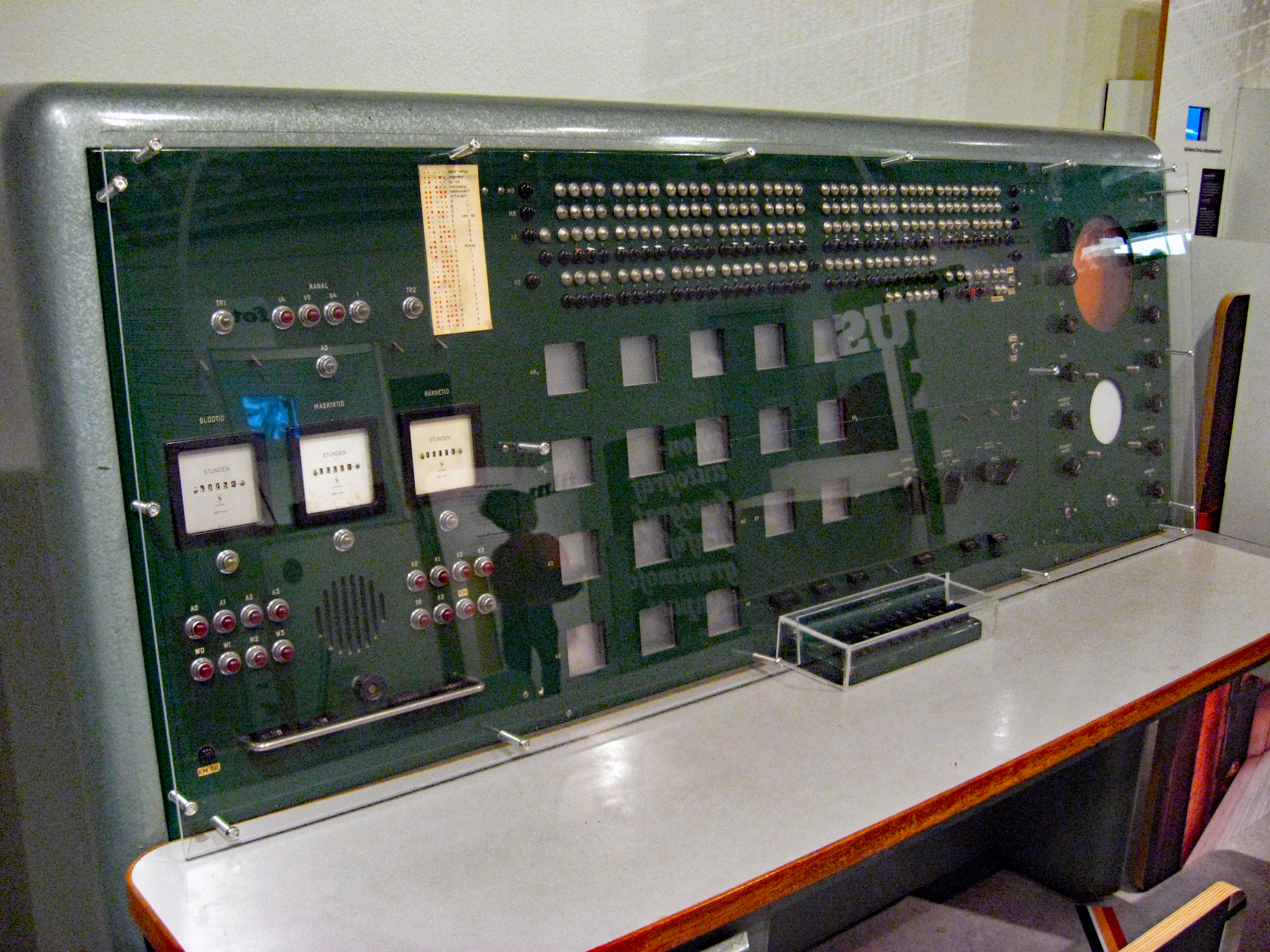
The Swedish electronic computer BESK, built in 1953, displayed 18 hexadecimal digits using edge-lit acrylic, the grey squares at the center of the green console.

It contains a set of sandwiched acrylic or clear plastic panels, each of which is engraved with a numeral or character to be displayed. Light from independently controlled incandescent bulbs passing into the edge of these panels reflects off the internal surfaces of the plastic. When the light encounters engraved digits, it is scattered, rendering a brightly illuminated digit or character.

== History ==
The principle of edge-lighting was discovered early and used for commercial signs. U.S. patent 1,139,723 for an "Electric edge lit sign" was filed on July 31, 1914, and granted in 1915. Other similar patents (1,707,965, 1,741,748, 2,082,724, 2,623,313) for illuminated signs were filed 1928-1948. But the need for digit read-out arose with electronic computers in the 1950s with many independent inventions, both in edge-lighting, nixie tubes and other technologies.

U.S. patent 2,751,584 for an edge-lit multi-layer digit "Visual readout device" was filed on November 10, 1953, by inventor Carl L. Isborn of Hawthorne, California, for the National Cash Register Company and granted on June 19, 1956.

For a similar invention of a "Visual in-line multi-symbol signal indicator", U.S. patent 2,766,447 was filed on July 7, 1954, by Wesley E. Woodson, Jr., El Cajon, and Jack I. Morgan of San Diego, California, and granted on October 9, 1956.

U.S. patent 2,813,266 for an "Indicator device and means for mounting" was filed on January 9, 1956, by Andrew F. Kay, Covert B. Meredith, and Leonard M. Scholl of San Diego County, California, and granted on November 12, 1957. This patent describes a display of five digits next to each other, whereas the earlier two describe just a single digit.

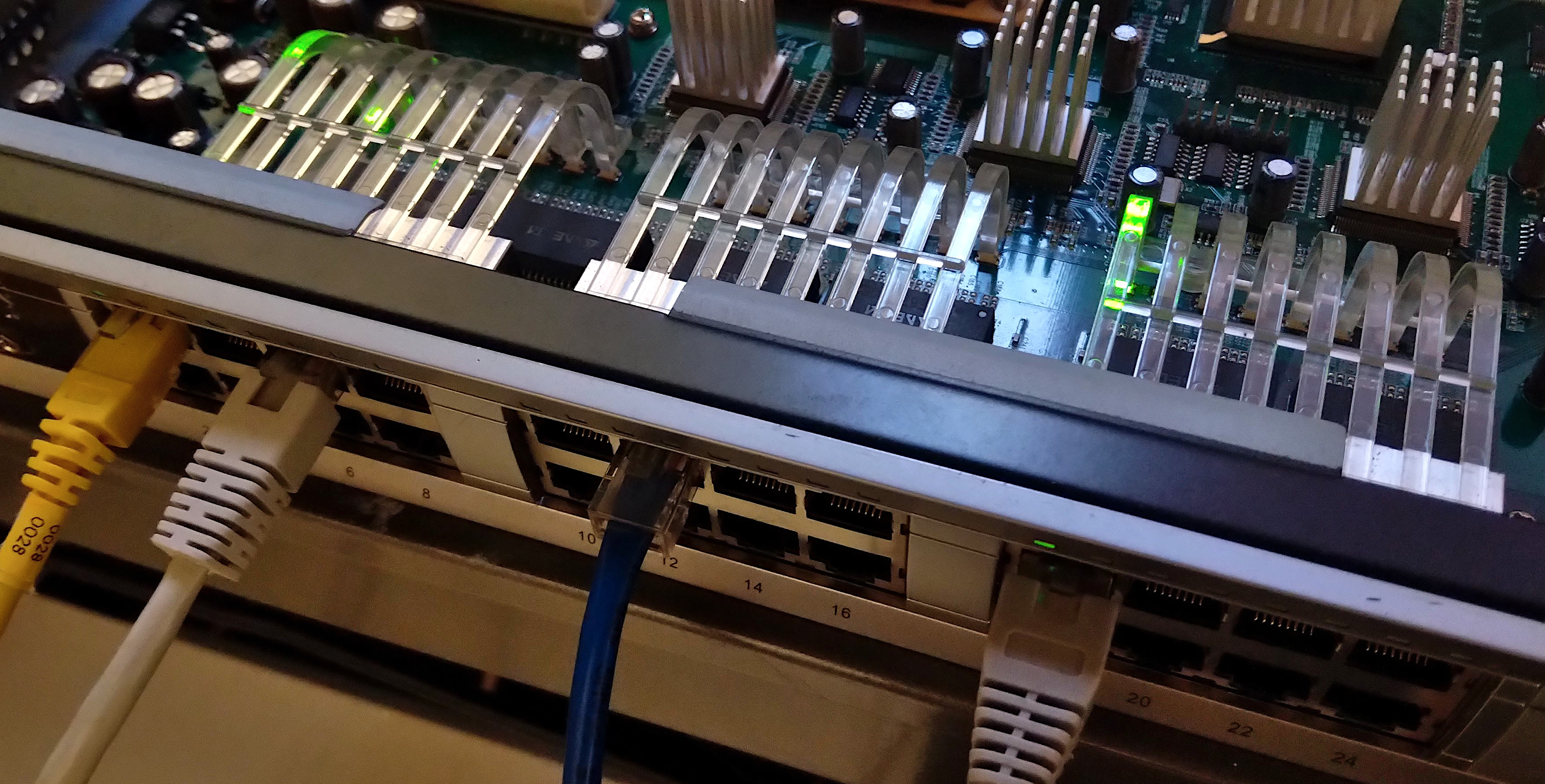
Light guide LEDs using plastic light guides on a network switch

The technology was rendered obsolete by the development of light-emitting diodes (LED) in the 1970s, though lightguide tubes are still used in electronics manufacturing, in situations where it is difficult to place an LED in the appropriate physical location on a display or bezel. In such cases, LEDs mounted on printed circuit boards are fitted with lightguides to channel light to the appropriate position. This employs the same principle used in optical fibers.

== See also ==
- Nixie tube
- Optical fiber
- Waveguide (optics)
