= Nimo tube =

Type of vacuum tube display

Digits of a BA0000-P31 Tube, showing burn-in of the number 0

Nimo was the trademark of a family of small cathode-ray tube (CRTs) used for numerical displays. They were manufactured by Industrial Electronic Engineers (IEE) around the mid-1960s. The tube had ten electron guns with stencils that shaped the electron beam as digits.

== Details ==
The Nimo tube operated on a similar principle to the Charactron, but used a much simpler design. They were intended as single digit, simple displays, or as four or six digits by means of a special horizontal magnetic deflection system. Having only three electrode types (a filament, an anode and ten different grids), the driving circuit for this tube was very simple, and as the image was projected on the glass face, it allowed a much wider viewing angle than, for example, Nixie tubes, which Nimo tried to replace.

The tube required 1750 volts direct current (DC) for the anode and also required 1.1 volts (DC or AC) to heat the filament. Also, the filament and each grid required a DC bias. The relative bias between the grids and filament determined which character was displayed on each tube. This allowed the display tubes to be multiplexed, simplifying the interface circuitry.

The German tube manufacturer Telefunken tried to sell an unlicensed copy of the design under the type number XM1000, but was sued by IEE in 1969 and lost, having to destroy all tubes already produced. Only a few survived, most of them not yet labeled.

IEE also offered a version of the Nimo tube that could show 4 digits at the same time by magnetically deflecting the electron beam, and had plans for a 6 digit version. The Nimo 64/Nimo 6500 had 64 electron guns with 64 different characters. It was available in 3 variants: EBCDIC, ASCII and Universal which had non-standard characters—each "character" cut into the stencil could if desired be a block of text, up to 5 lines of text with 8 characters per line.

== See also ==
- Charactron, another tube stencil based character display
