= Charactron =

Type of electron beam cathode-ray tube

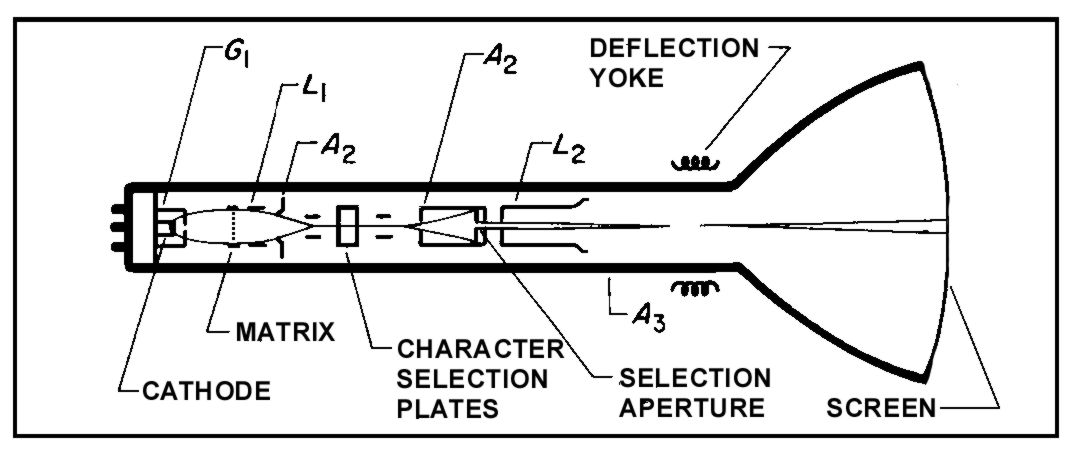
Basic Charactron tube design

Charactron was a U.S. registered trademark (number 0585950, 23 February 1954) of Consolidated Vultee Aircraft Corporation (Convair) for its shaped electron beam cathode-ray tube. Charactron CRTs performed functions of both a display device and a read-only memory storing multiple characters and fonts. The similar Typotron was a U.S. registered trademark (23 November 1953) of Hughes Aircraft Corporation for its type of shaped electron beam storage tube with a direct-view bistable storage screen.

The Charactron CRT used an electron beam to flood a specially patterned perforated anode that contained the stencil patterns for each of the characters that it could form. The first deflection positioning of the electron beam steered the beam to pass through one of the (typically 64 or 116) characters and symbols that could be formed. The beam, which then had the cross-section of the desired character, was re-centered along the axis of the tube and deflected to the desired position of the screen for display. Alternately, as in the accompanying image, the entire matrix was filled with the electron beam then deflected through a selection aperture to isolate one character.

The term Charactron is sometimes mistakenly applied to another type of CRT properly called a monoscope which generates an electrical signal by scanning an electron beam of uniform cross section across a printed pattern on an internal target electrode.

== Applications ==
There were two basic types/uses of Charactrons:

1. Direct view — where the intended user watched the face of the tube. An example was the 19-inch-diameter (480 mm) tube of the AN/FSQ-7 SAGE Semi Automatic Ground Environment computer console. Stromberg-Carlson's DatagraphiX division also released a series of video display terminals which also used Charactron tubes for their displays, such as the Stromberg DatagraphiX 1100 (1965), 1110 (1969), 1072 (1970), and the 132A (1977).
1. Photographic output — where the display screen was photographed by a microfilm camera for recording of computer generated data. The Stromberg-Carlson SC-4000 series system was a typical use of the 5-inch-diameter (130 mm) tube

The technical expertise, and trademarks, for the Charactron ultimately passed to Stromberg-Carlson, General Dynamics, Stromberg DatagraphiX, Anacomp, and finally Lexel Imaging Systems.

== Patents ==
- U.S. patent 2,735,956
- U.S. patent 2,824,250

== See also ==
- Nimo tube, another shaped electron beam display tube
