= Electron-refractive effect =

Electro-optic effect

The electron-refractive effect, also known as electron induced permittivity modification (EIPM), is an electro-optic effect observed in some crystals and amorphous materials, such as chalcogenide glasses and oxides, where the permittivity reduces or increases when the material is illuminated by high energy electrons, typically from a transmission electron microscope or scanning electron microscope. The effect is non-linear and reversible.

The effect was observed by N. Normand and O. Normand., who observed that the permittivity, of chalcogenide glass increased by as much as 5% when irradiated with an electron gun in the 30 keV range; they also noticed that the change was accompanied by a change in the thickness of the film. Recently San-Roman-Alerigi, Anjum and Ooi, demonstrated that the permittivity of chalcogenide thin films could also be reduced by as much as 50% when the sample was illuminated by 300 keV electrons; moreover they also demonstrated that the electron induced permittivity modification was reversible

== Mechanism ==
The change in permittivity occurs because of the disruption in the atomic structure of the materials. That is, the changes are due to the breaking of bonds and re-bonding within the atomic structure of the amorphous or crystalline structures. This modification in turn modifies the carrier traps within the band structure, reducing them, and hence ensuing the decrement in the permittivity

This contrasts with the photorefractive effect where the change is induced by the alteration in the electron distribution due to the photon-absorption.
