= Electro–optic effect =

Changes in optical properties from applied electric fields

An electro–optic effect is a change in the optical properties of a material in response to an electric field that varies slowly compared with the frequency of light. The term encompasses a number of distinct phenomena, which can be subdivided into

- a) change of the absorption
  - Electroabsorption: general change of the absorption constants
  - Franz–Keldysh effect: change in the absorption shown in some bulk semiconductors
  - Quantum-confined Stark effect: change in the absorption in some semiconductor quantum wells
  - Electrochromic effect: creation of an absorption band at some wavelengths, which gives rise to a change in colour
- b) change of the refractive index and permittivity
  - Pockels effect (or linear electro-optic effect): change in the refractive index linearly proportional to the electric field. Only certain crystalline solids show the Pockels effect, as it requires lack of inversion symmetry
  - Kerr effect (or quadratic electro-optic effect, QEO effect): change in the refractive index proportional to the square of the electric field. All materials display the Kerr effect, with varying magnitudes, but it is generally much weaker than the Pockels effect
  - electro-gyration: change in the optical activity.
  - Electron-refractive effect or EIPM

In December 2015, two further electro-optic effects of type (b) were theoretically predicted to exist but have not, as yet, been experimentally observed.

Changes in absorption can have a strong effect on refractive index for wavelengths near the absorption edge, due to the Kramers–Kronig relation.

Using a less strict definition of the electro-optic effect allowing also electric fields oscillating at optical frequencies, one could also include nonlinear absorption (absorption depends on the light intensity) to category a) and the optical Kerr effect (refractive index depends on the light intensity) to category b). Combined with the photoeffect and photoconductivity, the electro-optic effect gives rise to the photorefractive effect.

The term "electro-optic" is often erroneously used as a synonym for "optoelectronic".

== Applications ==
=== Electro-optic modulators ===
Electro-optic modulators are usually built with electro-optic crystals exhibiting the Pockels effect. The transmitted beam is phase modulated with the electric signal applied to the crystal. Amplitude modulators can be built by putting the electro-optic crystal between two linear polarizers or in one path of a Mach–Zehnder interferometer. Additionally, Amplitude modulators can be constructed by deflecting the beam into and out of a small aperture such as a fiber. This design can be low loss (<3 dB) and polarization independent depending on the crystal configuration.

=== Electro-optic deflectors ===
Electro-optic deflectors utilize prisms of electro-optic crystals. The index of refraction is changed by the Pockels effect, thus changing the direction of propagation of the beam inside the prism. Electro-optic deflectors have only a small number of resolvable spots, but possess a fast response time. There are few commercial models available at this time. This is because of competing acousto-optic deflectors, the small number of resolvable spots and the relatively high price of electro-optic crystals.

=== Electro-optic field sensors ===
The electro-optic Pockels effect in nonlinear crystals (e.g. KDP, BSO, K*DP) can be used for electric field sensing via polarisation state modulation techniques. In this scenario, an unknown electric field results in polarisation rotation of a laser beam propagating through the electro-optic crystal; through inclusion of polarisers to modulate the light intensity incident on a photodiode, a time-resolved electric field measurement can be reconstructed from the obtained voltage trace. As the signals obtained from the crystalline probes are optical, they are inherently resistant to electrical noise pickup, hence can be used for low-noise field measurement even in areas with high levels of electromagnetic noise in the vicinity of the probe. Furthermore, as the polarisation rotation due to the Pockels effect scales linearly with electric field, absolute field measurements are obtained, with no need for numerical integration to reconstruct electric fields, as is the case with conventional probes sensitive to the time-derivative of the electric field.

Electro-optic measurements of strong electromagnetic pulses from intense laser-matter interactions have been demonstrated in both the nanosecond and picosecond (sub-petawatt) laser pulse driver regimes.
