= Marcatili's method =

Analytical method

Marcatili’s method is an approximate analytical method that describes how light propagates through rectangular dielectric optical waveguides . It was published by Enrique Marcatili in 1969.

Optical dielectric waveguides guide electromagnetic waves in the optical spectrum (light). This type of waveguide consists of dielectric materials (e.g., glass, silicon, indium phosphide, etc). The core of the waveguide has a higher index of refraction than its surrounding and the light is guided due to total internal reflection. In a ray description, the light zig-zags between the walls.

The geometry of the waveguide dictates the light to propagate with specific velocities and specific distributions of the electric and magnetic fields, known as modes. For rectangular waveguides, these modes cannot be computed analytically. This can be done either using a numerical mode solver, or using an approximate method such as Marcatili’s method.

== Propagation velocity of the light in the waveguide ==
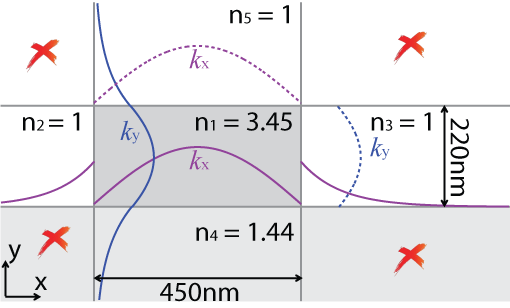
Sketch of the cross-section of a rectangular waveguide (450 nm x 220 nm). The waveguide consists of a silicon core (dark gray) on top of a silicon-dioxide layer (light-gray). Marcatili's method is sketched. The four outer quadrants are neglected. The standing waves in the core of the waveguide are sketched (blue and purple curves) and the exponentially decaying waves outside the waveguide are also sketched (blue and purple curves). The refractive index n of each of the regions is indicated.

The method can also be understood from the behavior of two planar (slab) waveguides. In his approximate method, the light zig-zags simultaneously upwards-and-downwards as well as left-and-rightwards. In a wave description, the mode is formed by a standing wave in both horizontal x-direction and vertical y-direction with wave vector ($k_x$, $k_y$, $\beta$). The up-and-downwards zig-zag path of the light ($k_y$) is given by a horizontal planar waveguide that is formed by the rectangular waveguide but with infinite width. The left-and-right zig-zag path ($k_x$) is given by a vertical planar waveguide that is formed by the rectangular waveguide but with infinite height. Knowing the zig-zag paths ($k_x$, $k_y$) allows to compute the propagation velocity of the light in the waveguide (or equivalently, the effective refractive index).

The propagation constant of the waveguide mode is then computed using: $\beta^2 = k^2 - k_x^2 - k_y^2$, where $k^2$ is the wavenumber corresponding to the core material of the waveguide, $k_x$ and $k_y$ are the wave-numbers corresponding to the standing waves in the x- and y-direction, and beta is the wavenumber in the propagation direction of the waveguide, also known as the propagation constant.

== Distribution of the electromagnetic field in the waveguide ==
Marcatili’s method used an Ansatz on the shape of the electromagnetic fields in the waveguide. In the core of the waveguide, the mode is a composed of a standing wave in the x- and y-directions. Outside the core, the field decays exponentially in horizontal and vertical directions. The outer quadrants of the rectangular waveguide are neglected.

For low-index-contrast waveguides $k \approx \beta$ because modes are not guided otherwise, so $k_x \ll \beta$ and $k_y \ll \beta$. Marcatili's method neglects these terms in the second order, and computes the electromagnetic fields in the waveguide based on this assumption and the Ansatz of the shape of the fields.

== Extension to high-index-contrast ==
Marcatili’s method was extended to the regime of high-index-contrast, i.e., a large difference between the refractive index of the core of the waveguide and its surrounding. An example of such a waveguide is a silicon-on-insulator (SOI) waveguide.

Based on Marcatili’s propagation constant and the Ansatz on the shape of the electromagnetic field, Westerveld and co-workers derived new relations for the distribution of the electric and magnetic fields. Maxwell’s equations require that the electromagnetic fields tangential to an interface between the core of the waveguide and its cladding are continuous. Several methods where proposed: The Extended Ey ≈ 0 method is based on continuity of the dominant electromagnetic field components. The amplitude optimization method in which the energy density associated with the discontinuity of the tangential field across the interfaces is minimized. These methods provided a more accurate description of the electromagnetic fields in subwavelength silicon waveguides.

== Implementations ==
RECTWG is an open-source implementation in Matlab of Marcatili's method as well as the extension to high-index-contrast. It allows computation of the effective index (propagation constant), the effective group index (dispersion), and the linear influence of external changes (e.g. temperature, cladding refractive index) and the electromagnetic fields of the modes in the waveguide. The method works for both TE-like and TM-like modes.
