= Photonic integrated circuit =

Microchip manipulating light instead of electricity

A photonic integrated circuit (PIC) or integrated optical circuit is a microchip containing two or more photonic components that form a functioning circuit. This technology detects, generates, transports, and processes light. Photonic integrated circuits use photons (or particles of light) as opposed to electrons that are used by electronic integrated circuits. The major difference between the two is that a photonic integrated circuit provides functions for information signals imposed on optical wavelengths typically in the visible spectrum or near-infrared (850–1650 nm).

One of the most commercially utilized material platforms for photonic integrated circuits is indium phosphide (InP), which allows for the integration of various optically active and passive functions on the same chip. Initial examples of photonic integrated circuits were simple 2-section distributed Bragg reflector (DBR) lasers, consisting of two independently controlled device sections—a gain section and a DBR mirror section. Consequently, all modern monolithic tunable lasers, widely tunable lasers, externally modulated lasers and transmitters, integrated receivers, etc. are examples of photonic integrated circuits. As of 2012, devices integrate hundreds of functions onto a single chip. Pioneering work in this arena was performed at Bell Laboratories. The most notable academic centers of excellence of photonic integrated circuits in InP are the University of California at Santa Barbara, USA, the Eindhoven University of Technology, and the University of Twente in the Netherlands.

A 2005 development showed that silicon can, even though it is an indirect bandgap material, still be used to generate laser light via the Raman nonlinearity. Such lasers are not electrically driven but optically driven and therefore still necessitate a further optical pump laser source.

== History ==
Photonics is the science behind the detection, generation, and manipulation of photons. According to quantum mechanics and the concept of wave–particle duality first proposed by Louis de Broglie in 1924, light acts as both an electromagnetic wave and a particle. For example, total internal reflection in an optical fibre allows it to act as a waveguide.

Integrated circuits using electrical components were first developed in the late 1940s and early 1950s, but it took until 1958 for them to become commercially available. When the laser and laser diode were invented in the 1960s, the term "photonics" fell into more common usage to describe the application of light to replace applications previously achieved through the use of electronics.

By the 1980s, photonics gained traction through its role in fibre optic communication. At the start of the decade, an assistant in a new research group at Delft University Of Technology, Meint Smit, started pioneering in the field of integrated photonics. He is credited with inventing the Arrayed Waveguide Grating (AWG), a core component of modern digital connections for the Internet and phones. Smit has received several awards, including an ERC Advanced Grant, a Rank Prize for Optoelectronics and a LEOS Technical Achievement Award.

In 2016, Intel began deploying 100G silicon photonics transceivers, a form of Silicon photonics technology that involves bonding light-emitting materials to silicon wafers. In this release, Intel introduced two products: 100G PSM4 and 100G CWDM4, representing the first high-volume commercial deployment of Silicon photonics.

In 2019, Patrick Bowen while working in a Duke University metamaterials lab, was able to shrink the size of an optical modulator by 10,000 times. Using this technology Patrick Bowen created a startup called Nuerophos to try and implement this thechnology into AI chips. His idea is that the photonic AI chips will cut down on power and heat costs.

In October 2022, during an experiment held at the Technical University of Denmark in Copenhagen, a photonic chip transmitted 1.84 petabits per second of data over a fibre-optic cable more than 7.9 kilometres long. First, the data stream was split into 37 sections, each of which was sent down a separate core of the fibre-optic cable. Next, each of these channels was split into 223 parts corresponding to equidistant spikes of light across the spectrum.

== Comparison to electronic integration ==
Unlike electronic integration where silicon is the dominant material, system photonic integrated circuits have been fabricated from a variety of material systems, including electro-optic crystals such as lithium niobate, silica on silicon, silicon on insulator, various polymers, and semiconductor materials which are used to make semiconductor lasers such as GaAs and InP. The different material systems are used because they each provide different advantages and limitations depending on the function to be integrated. For instance, silica (silicon dioxide) based PICs have very desirable properties for passive photonic circuits such as AWGs (see below) due to their comparatively low losses and low thermal sensitivity, GaAs or InP based PICs allow the direct integration of light sources and Silicon PICs enable co-integration of the photonics with transistor based electronics.

The fabrication techniques are similar to those used in electronic integrated circuits in which photolithography is used to pattern wafers for etching and material deposition. Unlike electronics where the primary device is the transistor, there is no single dominant device. The range of devices required on a chip includes low loss interconnect waveguides, power splitters, optical amplifiers, optical modulators, filters, lasers and detectors. These devices require a variety of different materials and fabrication techniques making it difficult to realize all of them on a single chip.

Newer techniques using resonant photonic interferometry is making way for UV LEDs to be used for optical computing requirements with much cheaper costs leading the way to petahertz consumer electronics.

== Examples of photonic integrated circuits ==
The primary application for photonic integrated circuits is in the area of fiber-optic communication though applications in other fields such as biomedical and photonic computing are also possible.

The arrayed waveguide gratings (AWGs) which are commonly used as optical (de)multiplexers in wavelength division multiplexed (WDM) fiber-optic communication systems are an example of a photonic integrated circuit which has replaced previous multiplexing schemes which utilized multiple discrete filter elements. Since separating optical modes is a need for quantum computing, this technology may be helpful to miniaturize quantum computers (see linear optical quantum computing).

Another example of a photonic integrated chip in wide use today in fiber-optic communication systems is the externally modulated laser (EML) which combines a distributed feed back laser diode with an electro-absorption modulator on a single InP based chip.

== Applications ==
Photonic chips are used for sensors, such as Lidar, diagnostic sensors for healthcare, instruments on satellites, in telecommunications for fibre-optic communication, among other things.

=== Data and telecommunications ===
The primary application for PICs is in the area of fibre-optic communication. The arrayed waveguide grating (AWG) which are commonly used as optical (de)multiplexers in wavelength division multiplexed (WDM) fibre-optic communication systems are an example of a photonic integrated circuit. Another example in fibre-optic communication systems is the externally modulated laser (EML) which combines a distributed feedback laser diode with an electro-absorption modulator.

The PICs can also increase bandwidth and data transfer speeds by deploying few-modes optical planar waveguides. Especially, if modes can be easily converted from conventional single-mode planar waveguides into few-mode waveguides, and selectively excite the desired modes. For example, a bidirectional spatial mode slicer and combiner can be used to achieve the desired higher or lower-order modes. Its principle of operation depends on cascading stages of V-shape and/ or M-shape graded-index planar waveguides.

PICs also reduce energy consumption in data centres. Researchers at Columbia Engineering integrated optical elements into computing chips, decreasing the amount of energy and space required for data transfer in interconnected systems. Their system had a bandwidth of 800 Gb/s and a density of 5.3 Tb/s/mm².

=== Healthcare and medicine ===
PICs are being developed for use as biosensors in medicine to provide faster tests and imaging for radiation therapy. Amazec Photonics has developed a photonic sensor which enables external temperature sensing with sub-millikelvin precision. This increase in precision allows medical specialists to better measure cardiac output and circulating blood volume to monitor for heart disease. Optical sensors are also used in EFI's Optirip device, which offers greater tissue feeling for minimally invasive surgery.

=== Automotive and engineering applications ===
PICs are used in LiDAR sensor systems to monitor vehicles' surroundings. Fiber Bragg grating sensors can be used to sense pressure, temperature, vibrations, accelerations, and mechanical strain.

=== Agriculture and food ===
Sensors play a role in innovations in agriculture and the food industry in order to reduce wastage and detect diseases. Light sensing technology powered by PICs can sense non-visible light, allowing detection of disease, ripeness and nutrients in fruit and plants. It can also help food producers to determine soil quality and plant growth. It can also measure CO_{2} emissions. Near-infrared spectromoters have been miniaturized and can be used to analyse products such as milk and plastics.

== Types of fabrication and materials ==
The fabrication techniques are similar to those used in electronic integrated circuits, in which photolithography is used to pattern wafers for etching and material deposition.

The platforms considered most versatile are indium phosphide (InP) and silicon photonics (SiPh):

- Indium phosphide (InP) PICs have active laser generation, amplification, control, and detection. This makes them an ideal component for communication and sensing applications.
- Silicon nitride (SiN) PICs have a vast spectral range and ultra low-loss waveguide. This makes them highly suited to detectors, spectrometers, biosensors, and quantum computers. The lowest propagation losses reported in SiN (0.1 dB/cm down to 0.1 dB/m) have been achieved by LioniX International's TriPleX waveguides.
- Silicon photonics (SiPh) PICs provide low losses for passive components like waveguides and can be used in minuscule photonic circuits. They are compatible with existing electronic fabrication.

The term "silicon photonics" actually refers to the technology rather than the material. It combines high density photonic integrated circuits (PICs) with complementary metal oxide semiconductor (CMOS) electronics fabrication. The most technologically mature and commercially used platform is silicon on insulator (SOI).

Other platforms include:

- Lithium niobate (LiNbO_{3}) is an ideal modulator for low loss mode. It is highly effective at matching fibre input–output due to its low index and broad transparency window. For more complex PICs, lithium niobate can be formed into large crystals. As part of project ELENA, there is a European initiative to stimulate production of LiNbO_{3}-PICs. Attempts are also being made to develop lithium niobate on insulator (LNOI).
- Lithium tantalate (LiTaO_{3}) is another integrated electro-optical (EO) photonics platform made available from lithium tantalate on insulator (LTOI) wafers. LTOI-based integrated modulators have similar EO Pockels coefficient as lithium niobate, but with much lower birefringence for high-speed and broadband photonic applications.
- Barium titanate (BaTiO_{3}) is another EO material possessing among the highest Pockels coefficient for PIC devices. Thin-film barium titanate-based EO modulators features low driving voltage and high efficiency, despite comparatively lower EO bandwidth than lithium niobate and lithium tantalate.
- Silica has a low weight and small form factor. It is a common component of optical communication networks, such as planar light wave circuits (PLCs).
- Gallium arsenide (GaAs) has high electron mobility. This means GaAs transistors operate at high speeds, making them ideal analogue integrated circuit drivers for high speed lasers and modulators. Other group III-V semiconductors such as gallium phosphide (GaP) are also explored for integrated nonlinear photonics.

By combining and configuring different chip types (including existing electronic chips) in a hybrid or heterogeneous integration, it is possible to leverage the strengths of each. Taking this complementary approach to integration addresses the demand for increasingly sophisticated energy-efficient solutions.

== Current status ==
As of 2026, a major driver for continued photonic integrated circuits research and development is their applications in Generative AI and AI data centers. This is seen in co-packaged optics, where PICs are placed on the same substrate as the main processor, such as a GPU or switch ASICs. The motivation for developing this technology lies in its theoretical increases in data bandwidth, throughput, and power efficiency for AI infrastructure.

The use of PICs in Generative AI and AI data centers has not yet been optimized. The startup Nuerophos and the government agency DARPA have been invested in to optimize PICs when used with AI. DARPAs PICASSO program was formed to find a way to convert photonic signals to electrical signals.

Lightmatter is another startup focused on creating photonic AI chips. They link AI chips with optical fiber instead of copper. With around $850M raised they have team up with NVIDIA to help implement.

Another emerging application of PICs is Integrated quantum photonics. PICs augment the early approach to quantum computing of LOQC by replacing bulkier mirrors and beam splitters with silicon chips, presenting potential improvements in circuit size, stability, and cost.

The above applications of PICs have not yet seen mass deployment, although companies such as Broadcom are beginning commercialization.

== See also ==
- Integrated quantum photonics
- Optical computing
- Optical transistor
- Silicon photonics
