= Arrayed waveguide grating =

Optical multiplexer component

Arrayed waveguide gratings (AWG) are commonly used as optical (de)multiplexers in wavelength division multiplexed (WDM) systems. These devices are capable of multiplexing many wavelengths into a single optical fiber, thereby increasing the transmission capacity of optical networks considerably.

The devices are based on a fundamental principle of optics, which states that light waves of different wavelengths do not interfere linearly with each other. This means that, if each channel in an optical communication network makes use of light of a slightly different wavelength, then the light from many of these channels can be carried by a single optical fiber with negligible crosstalk between the channels. The AWGs are used to multiplex channels of several wavelengths onto a single optical fiber at the transmission end and are also used as demultiplexers to retrieve individual channels of different wavelengths at the receiving end of an optical communication network.

== Operation of AWG devices ==
The incoming light (1) traverses a free space (2) and enters a bundle of optical fibers or channel waveguides (3). The fibers have different length and thus apply a different phase shift at the exit of the fibers. The light then traverses another free space (4) and interferes at the entries of the output waveguides (5) in such a way that each output channel receives only light of a certain wavelength. The orange lines only illustrate the light path. The light path from (1) to (5) is a demultiplexer, from (5) to (1) a multiplexer.

Conventional silica-based AWGs, as illustrated in the figure above, are planar lightwave circuits fabricated by depositing layers of doped and undoped silica on a silicon substrate.

The AWGs consist of a number of input (1) and output (5) couplers, a free space propagation region (2) and (4) and the grating waveguides (3). The grating waveguides consists of many waveguides, each having a constant length increment (ΔL).

- Light is coupled into the device via an optical fiber (1) connected to the input port.
- Light diffracting out of the input waveguide at the coupler/slab interface propagates through the free-space region (2) and illuminates the grating with a Gaussian distribution.
- Each wavelength of light coupled to the grating waveguides (3) undergoes a constant change of phase attributed to the constant length increment in grating waveguides.
- The diffracted light from each waveguide within the grating undergoes constructive interference, resulting in a refocusing of the light at the output waveguides (5). The spatial position of the output channels is wavelength-dependent, determined by the array phase shift induced by the constant length increment in the grating waveguides.
