= Nixie tube =

Electronic numeric display device

The ten digits of a GN-4 Nixie tube

A Nixie tube (/ˈnɪk.siː/ NIK-see), or cold cathode display, is an electronic device used for displaying numerals or other information using glow discharge.

The glass tube contains a wire-mesh anode and multiple cathodes, shaped like numerals or other symbols. Applying power to one cathode surrounds it with an orange glow discharge. The tube is filled with a gas at low pressure, usually mostly neon and a small amount of argon, in a Penning mixture. In later nixies, in order to extend the usable life of the device, a tiny amount of mercury was added to reduce cathode poisoning and sputtering.

Although it resembles a vacuum tube in appearance, its operation does not depend on thermionic emission of electrons from a hot cathode. It is hence a cold cathode tube (a form of gas-filled tube), and is a variant of the neon lamp. Such tubes rarely exceed 40 °C (104 °F) even under the most severe of operating conditions in a room at ambient temperature. Vacuum fluorescent displays from the same era use completely different technology—they have a heated cathode together with a control grid and shaped phosphor anodes; Nixies have no heater or control grid, typically a single anode (in the form of a wire mesh, not to be confused with a control grid), and shaped bare metal cathodes.

== History ==
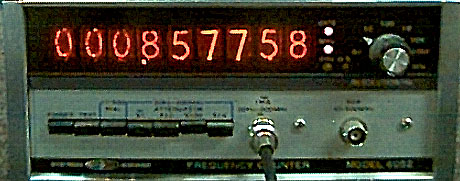
Systron-Donner frequency counter from 1973 with Nixie-tube display

Nixie tubes were invented by David Hagelbarger. The early Nixie displays were made by a small vacuum tube manufacturer called Haydu Brothers Laboratories, and were introduced in 1955 by Burroughs Corporation, which purchased Haydu. The name Nixie was derived by Burroughs from "NIX I", an abbreviation of "Numeric Indicator eXperimental No. 1", although this may have been a backronym designed to justify the evocation of the mythical creature with this name. Hundreds of variations of this design were manufactured by many firms, from the 1950s until the 1990s. The Burroughs Corporation introduced "Nixie" and owned the name Nixie as a trademark. Nixie-like displays made by other firms had trademarked names including Digitron, Inditron and Numicator. A proper generic term is cold cathode neon readout tube, though the phrase Nixie tube quickly entered the vernacular as a generic name.

Burroughs even had another Haydu tube that could operate as a digital counter and directly drive a Nixie tube for display. This was called a "Trochotron", in later form known as the "Beam-X Switch" counter tube; another name was "magnetron beam-switching tube", referring to their derivation from a split-anode magnetron. Trochotrons were used in the UNIVAC 1101 computer, as well as in clocks and frequency counters.

The first trochotrons were surrounded by a hollow cylindrical magnet, with poles at the ends. The field inside the magnet had essentially-parallel lines of force, parallel to the axis of the tube. It was a thermionic vacuum tube; inside were a central cathode, ten anodes, and ten "spade" electrodes. The magnetic field and voltages applied to the electrodes made the electrons form a thick sheet (as in a cavity magnetron) that went to only one anode. Applying a pulse with specified width and voltages to the spades made the sheet advance to the next anode, where it stayed until the next advance pulse. Count direction was determined by the direction of the magnetic field, and as such was not reversible. A later form of trochotron called a Beam-X Switch replaced the large, heavy external cylindrical magnet with ten small internal metal-alloy rod magnets which also served as electrodes.

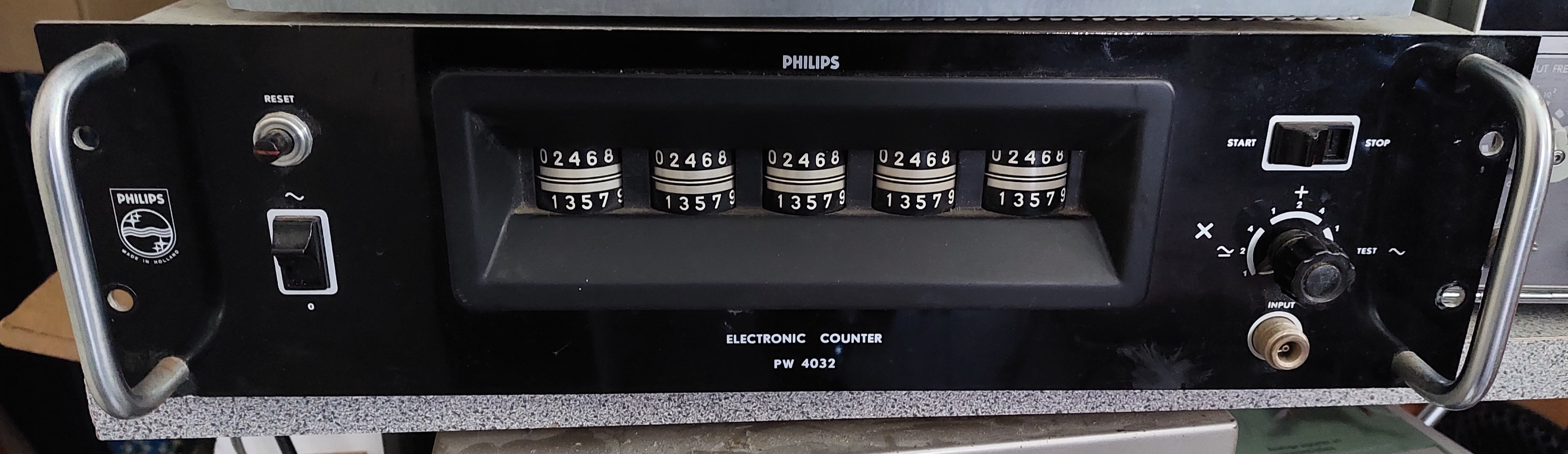
Philips five digit, 120kHz electronic counter with E1T tubes for nuclear and scientific applications

In 1949, Philips invented the E1T, another beam deflection counter tube. It is a thermionic vacuum tube with ten states and direct readout. Philips designed the PW4032, five digit, 120kHz Electronic Counter around this tube.

Glow-transfer counting tubes, similar in essential function to the trochotrons, had a glow discharge on one of a number of main cathodes, visible through the top of the glass envelope. Most used a neon-based gas mixture and counted in base-10, but faster types were based on argon, hydrogen, or other gases, and for timekeeping and similar applications a few base-12 types were available. Sets of "guide" cathodes (usually two sets, but some types had one or three) between the indicating cathodes moved the glow in steps to the next main cathode. Types with two or three sets of guide cathodes could count in either direction. A well-known trade name for glow-transfer counter tubes in the United Kingdom was Dekatron. Types with connections to each individual indicating cathode, which enabled presetting the tube's state to any value (in contrast to simpler types which could only be directly reset to zero or a small subset of their total number of states), were trade named Selectron tubes.

At least one device that functioned in the same way as Nixie tubes was patented in the 1930s . There were a number of relevant patents filed by Northrop and others around the early 1950s, and the first mass-produced display tubes were introduced in 1954 by National Union Co. under the brand name Inditron. However, the construction of the first Inditrons was cruder than that of the later Nixies, lacking the common anode grid, so that the unlit numerals were held at anode voltage to function as the effective anode. Their average lifetime was shorter, and they failed to find many applications due to their complex drive needs.

== Design ==
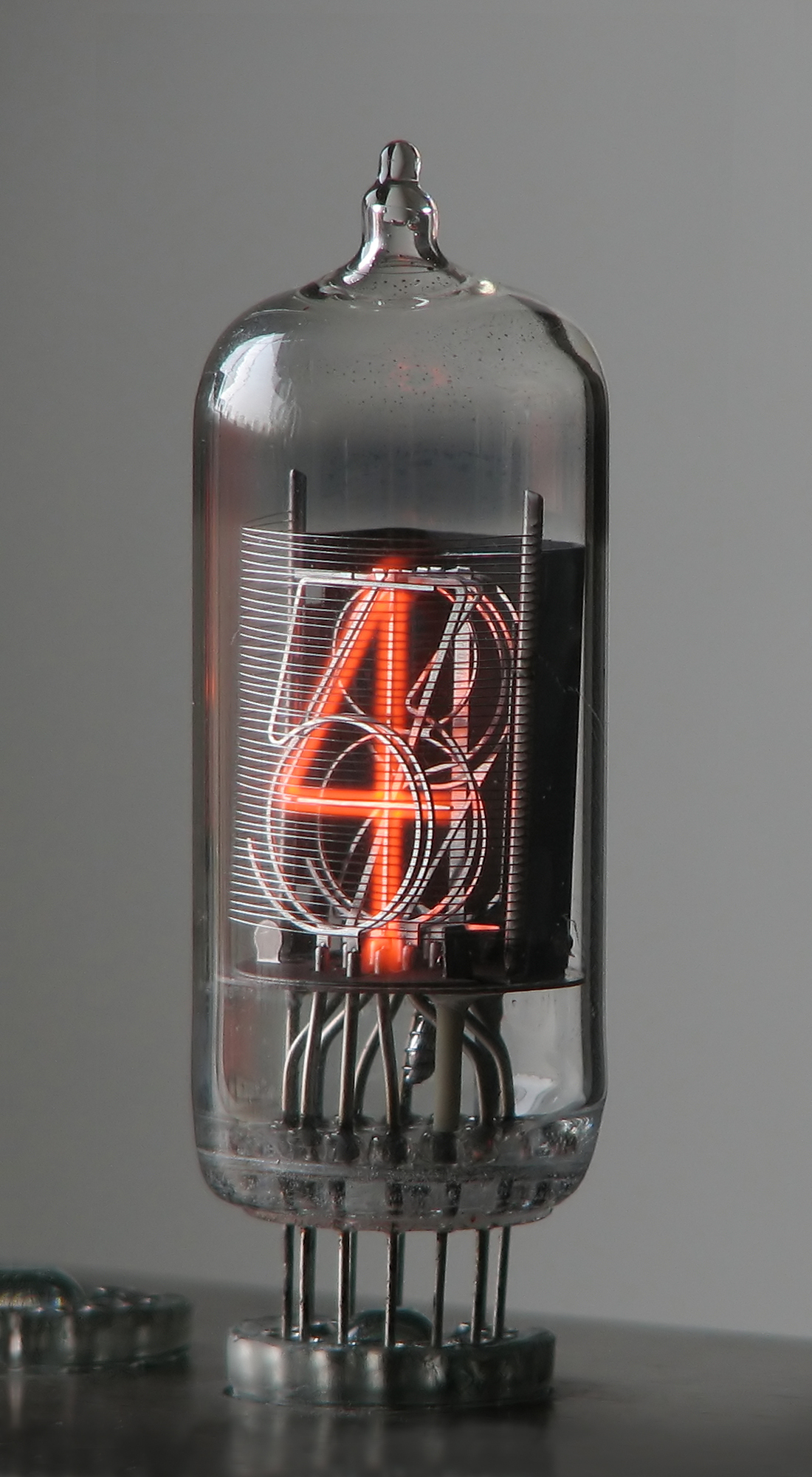
The stacked digit arrangement in a Nixie tube is visible in this (stripped) ZM1210.

The most common form of Nixie tube has ten cathodes in the shapes of the numerals 0 to 9 (and occasionally a decimal point or two), but there are also types that show various letters, signs and symbols. Because the numbers and other characters are arranged one behind another, each character appears at a different depth, giving Nixie based displays a distinct appearance. A related device is the pixie tube, which uses a stencil mask with numeral-shaped holes instead of shaped cathodes. Some Russian Nixies, e.g. the ИH-14 (IN-14), used an upside-down digit 2 as the digit 5, presumably to save manufacturing costs.

Each cathode can be made to glow in the characteristic neon red-orange color by applying about 170 volts DC at a few milliamperes between a cathode and the anode. The current limiting is normally implemented as an anode resistor of a few tens of thousands of ohms. Nixies exhibit negative resistance and will maintain their glow at typically 20 V to 30 V below the strike voltage. Some color variation can be observed between types, caused by differences in the gas mixtures used. Longer-life tubes that were manufactured later in the Nixie timeline have mercury added to reduce sputtering resulting in a blue or purple tinge to the emitted light. In some cases, these colors are filtered out by a red or orange filter coating on the glass.

One advantage of the Nixie tube is that its cathodes are typographically designed, shaped for legibility. In most types, they are not placed in numerical sequence from back to front, but arranged so that cathodes in front obscure the lit cathode minimally. One such arrangement is 6 7 5 8 4 3 9 2 0 1 from front (6) to back (1). Russian ИH-12A (IN-12A) and ИH-12B (IN-12B) tubes use the number arrangement 3 8 9 4 0 5 7 2 6 1 from front (3) to back (1), with the 5 being an upside down 2. The ИH-12B tubes feature a bottom far left decimal point between the numbers 8 and 3.

== Applications and lifetime ==
Nixies were used as numeric displays in early digital voltmeters, multimeters, frequency counters and many other types of technical equipment. They also appeared in costly digital time displays used in research and military establishments, and in many early electronic desktop calculators, including the first: the Sumlock-Comptometer ANITA Mk VII of 1961 and even the first electronic telephone switchboards. Later alphanumeric versions in fourteen-segment display format found use in airport arrival/departure signs. Some elevators used Nixies to display floor numbers.

Average longevity of Nixie tubes varied from about 5,000 hours for the earliest types, to as high as 200,000 hours or more for some of the last types to be introduced. There is no formal definition as to what constitutes "end of life" for Nixies, mechanical failure excepted. Some sources suggest that incomplete glow coverage of a glyph ("cathode poisoning") or appearance of glow elsewhere in the tube would not be acceptable.

Nixie tubes are susceptible to multiple failure modes, including:

- Simple breakage
- Cracks and hermetic seal leaks allowing the atmosphere to enter
- Cathode poisoning preventing part or all of one or more characters from illuminating
- Increased striking voltage causing flicker or failure to light
- Sputtering of electrode metal onto the glass envelope blocking the cathodes from view
- Internal open or short circuits which may be due to physical abuse or sputtering

Driving Nixies outside of their specified electrical parameters will accelerate their demise, especially excess current, which increases sputtering of the electrodes. A few extreme examples of sputtering have even resulted in complete disintegration of Nixie-tube cathodes.

Cathode poisoning can be abated by limiting current through the tubes to significantly below their maximum rating, through the use of Nixie tubes constructed from materials that avoid the effect (e.g. by being free of silicates and aluminum), or by programming devices to periodically cycle through all digits so that seldom-displayed ones get activated.

As of 2006, several suppliers still provided common Nixie tube types as replacement parts, new in original packaging. Devices with Nixie-tube displays in excellent working condition are still plentiful, though many have been in use for 30 to 40 years or more. Such items can be found as surplus and obtained at little expense. In the former Soviet Union, Nixies were still being manufactured in volume in the 1980s, so Russian and Eastern European Nixies are still available.

== Alternatives and successors ==
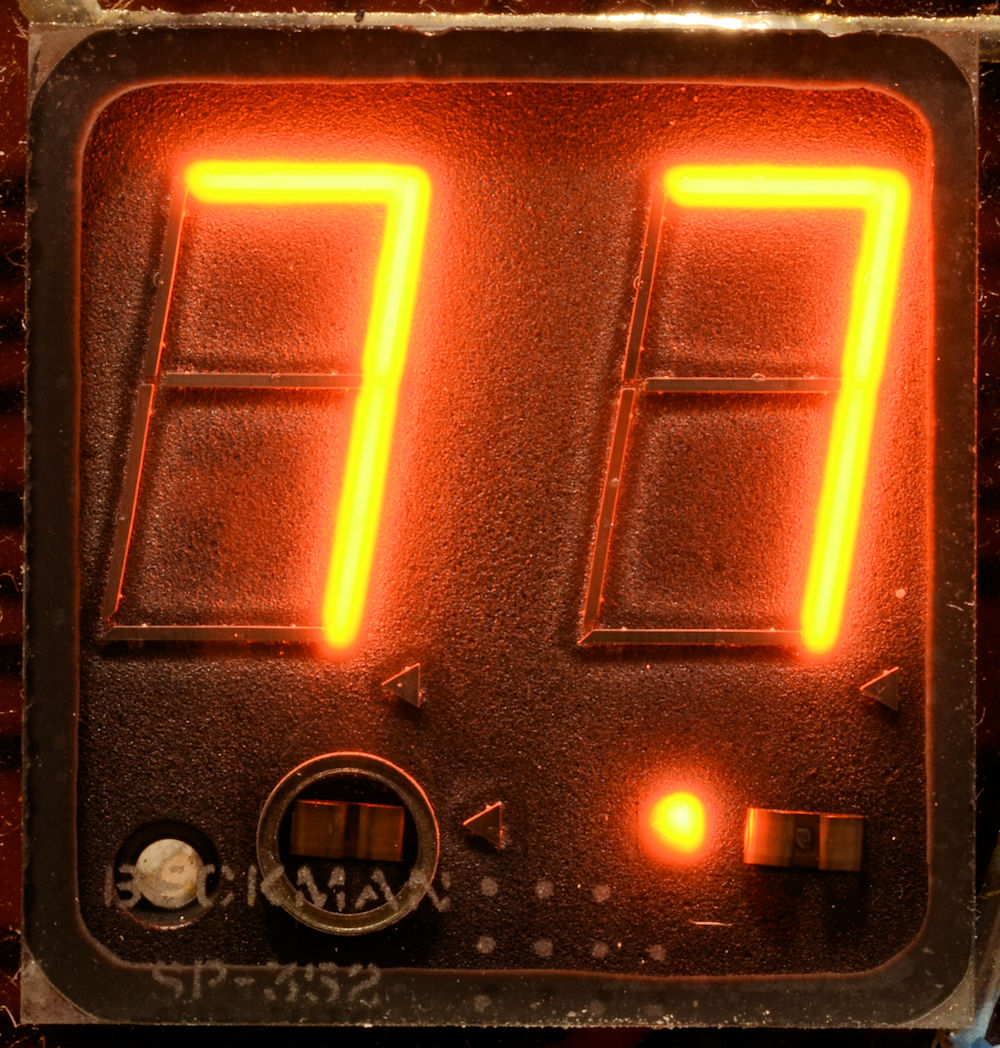
A 2-digit seven-segment ″Panaplex″-display made by Beckman (1974)

Other numeric-display technologies include light pipes, rear-projection and edge-lit lightguide displays (all using individual incandescent or neon light bulbs for illumination), Numitron incandescent filament readouts, Panaplex seven-segment displays, and vacuum fluorescent display tubes. Before Nixie tubes became prominent, most numeric displays were electromechanical, using stepping mechanisms to display digits either directly by use of cylinders bearing printed numerals attached to their rotors, or indirectly by wiring the outputs of stepping switches to indicator bulbs. Later, a few vintage clocks even used a form of stepping switch to drive Nixie tubes.

Nixie tubes were superseded in the 1970s by light-emitting diodes (LEDs) and vacuum fluorescent displays (VFDs), often in the form of seven-segment displays. The VFD uses a hot filament to emit electrons, a control grid and phosphor-coated anodes (similar to a cathode-ray tube) shaped to represent segments of a digit, pixels of a graphical display, or complete letters, symbols, or words. Whereas Nixies typically require 180 volts to illuminate, VFDs only require relatively low voltages to operate, making them easier and cheaper to use. VFDs have a simple internal structure, resulting in a bright, sharp, and unobstructed image. Unlike Nixies, the glass envelope of a VFD is evacuated rather than being filled with a specific mixture of gases at low pressure.

Specialized high-voltage driver chips such as the 7441/74141 were available to drive Nixies. LEDs are better suited to the low voltages that semiconductor integrated circuits typically use, which was an advantage for devices such as pocket calculators, digital watches, and handheld digital measurement instruments. Also, LEDs are much smaller and sturdier, without a fragile glass envelope. LEDs use less power than VFDs or Nixie tubes with the same function.

== Legacy ==
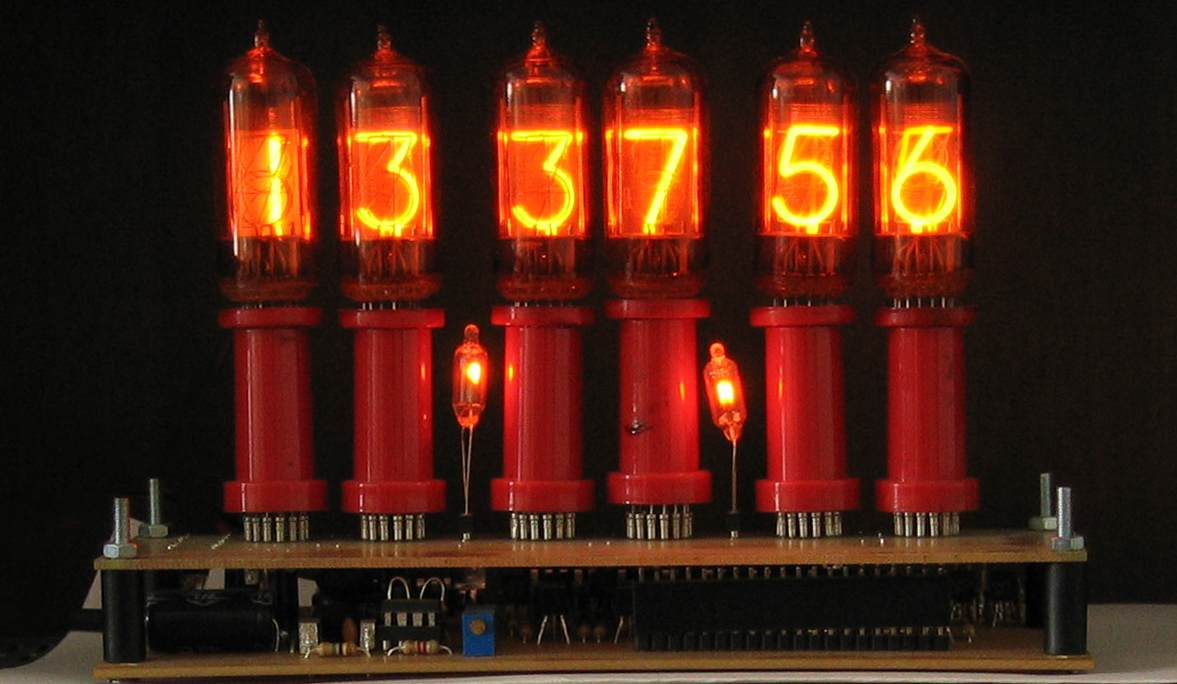
A Nixie clock with six ZM1210 tubes made by Telefunken

Citing dissatisfaction with the aesthetics of modern digital displays and a nostalgic fondness for the styling of obsolete technology, significant numbers of electronics enthusiasts have shown interest in reviving Nixies. Unsold tubes that have been sitting in warehouses for decades are being brought out and used, the most common application being in homemade digital clocks. During their heyday, Nixies were generally considered too expensive for use in mass-market consumer goods such as clocks. This recent surge in demand has caused prices to rise significantly, particularly for large tubes, making small-scale production of new tubes financially viable.

In addition to the tube itself, another important consideration is the relatively high-voltage circuitry necessary to drive the tube. The original 7400 series drivers integrated circuits such as the 74141 BCD decoder driver have long since been out of production and are rarer than NOS tubes. The 74141 is still available as NOS from various web suppliers and the Soviet equivalent, the K155ID1, is still in production. However, modern bipolar transistors with high voltage ratings are now available cheaply, such as MPSA92 or MPSA42.

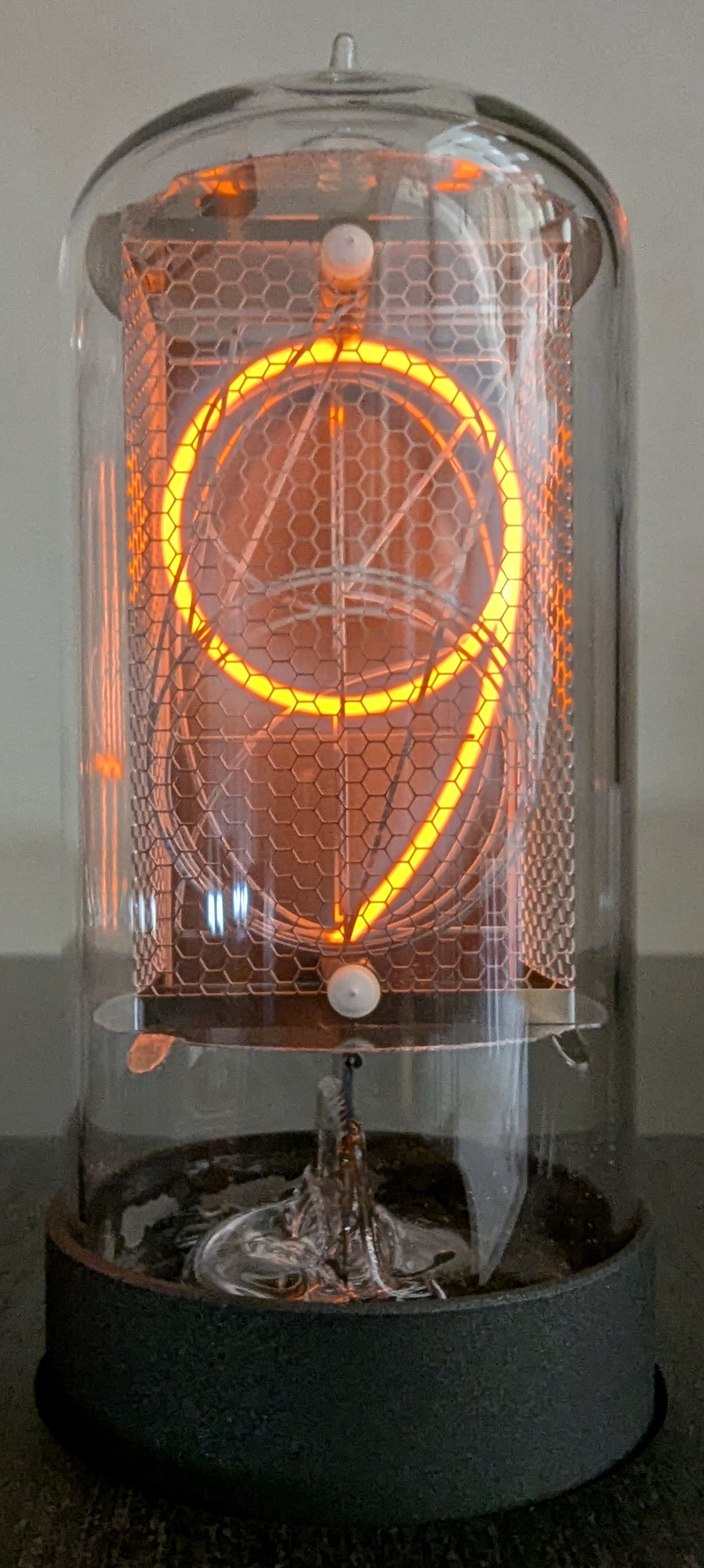
An R\Z568M Nixie tube manufactured by Dalibor Farny, a modern reproduction of a Z568 tube

== See also ==
- Genericized trademark
- Nimo tube
- Numitron tube
- Sixteen-segment display
- Vacuum fluorescent display
