= Franz–Keldysh effect =

Change in optical absorption by a semiconductor when an electric field is applied

The Franz–Keldysh effect is a change in optical absorption by a semiconductor when an electric field is applied. The effect is named after the German physicist Walter Franz and Russian physicist Leonid Keldysh.

Karl W. Böer observed first the shift of the optical absorption edge with electric fields during the discovery of high-field domains and named this the Franz-effect. A few months later, when the English translation of the Keldysh paper became available, he corrected this to the Franz–Keldysh effect.

As originally conceived, the Franz–Keldysh effect is the result of wavefunctions "leaking" into the band gap. When an electric field is applied, the electron and hole wavefunctions become Airy functions rather than plane waves. The Airy function includes a "tail" which extends into the classically forbidden band gap. According to Fermi's golden rule, the more overlap there is between the wavefunctions of a free electron and a hole, the stronger the optical absorption will be. The Airy tails slightly overlap even if the electron and hole are at slightly different potentials (slightly different physical locations along the field). The absorption spectrum now includes a tail at energies below the band gap and some oscillations above it. This explanation does, however, omit the effects of excitons, which may dominate optical properties near the band gap.

The Franz–Keldysh effect occurs in uniform, bulk semiconductors, unlike the quantum-confined Stark effect, which requires a quantum well. Both are used for electro-absorption modulators. The Franz–Keldysh effect usually requires hundreds of volts, limiting its usefulness with conventional electronics – although this is not the case for commercially available Franz–Keldysh-effect electro-absorption modulators that use a waveguide geometry to guide the optical carrier.

== Effect on modulation spectroscopy ==
The absorption coefficient is related to the dielectric constant (especially the complex part $\kappa$_{2}). From Maxwell's equation, we can easily find out the relation,

$$\alpha = \frac{2\omega k_0} {c}={{\omega\kappa_2} \over{n_0c}}.$$

n_{0} and k_{0} are the real and complex parts of the refractive index of the material. We will consider the direct transition of an electron from the valence band to the conduction band induced by the incident light in a perfect crystal and try to take into account of the change of absorption coefficient for each Hamiltonian with a probable interaction like electron-photon, electron-hole, external field. These approach follows from. We put the 1st purpose on the theoretical background of Franz–Keldysh effect and third-derivative modulation spectroscopy.

=== One electron Hamiltonian in an electro-magnetic field ===
$$H = {1 \over 2m} (\mathbf{p}+e\mathbf{A})^2 + V(\mathbf{r})$$

where A is the vector potential and V(r) is a periodic potential.

$$\mathbf A = {1 \over 2}  A_0 \mathbf e [e^{\mathrm i(\mathbf k_p \cdot \mathbf r - \omega t)}+e^{-\mathrm i(\mathbf k_p \cdot \mathbf r - \omega t)}]$$

(k_{p} and e are the wave vector of em field and unit vector.)

Neglecting the square term $A^2$ and using the relation $\mathbf{A}\cdot \mathbf{p} = \mathbf{p} \cdot \mathbf A$ within the Coulomb gauge $\nabla\cdot \mathbf A=0$, we obtain

$$H \sim {p^2 \over 2m} + V(\mathbf r) + {e \over m} \mathbf A \cdot \mathbf p$$

Then using the Bloch function $|jk\rangle = e^{\mathrm i\mathbf k \cdot \mathbf r} u_{jk}(\mathbf r)$ (j = v, c that mean valence band, conduction band)

the transition probability can be obtained such that

$$w_{cv} = {2 \pi \over \hbar} |\langle ck'| {e \over m} \mathbf A \cdot \mathbf p |vk\rangle|^2\delta[E_c (k') - E_v (k) - \hbar \omega]$$
$$= {\pi e^2 \over 2 \hbar m^2}A_0 ^2 |\langle ck'|\exp(\mathrm i\mathbf k_p \cdot \mathbf r)\mathbf e \cdot \mathbf p |vk\rangle |^2 \delta[E_c (k') - E_v (k) - \hbar \omega]$$
$$\mathbf e \cdot \mathbf p_{cv} = {1 \over V} \int_v e^{\mathrm i(\mathbf k_p +\mathbf k- \mathbf k') \cdot \mathbf r} {u^*}_{ck'}(\mathbf r)\mathbf e \cdot (\mathbf p+ \hbar \mathbf k)u_{vk} (\mathbf r) d^3r$$

Power dissipation of the electromagnetic waves per unit time and unit volume gives rise to following equation

$\hbar \omega w_{cv} = {1 \over 2} \omega \kappa_2 \epsilon_0 {E_0}^2$

From the relation between the electric field and the vector potential, $\mathbf{E} = -{{\partial \mathbf A} \over {\partial t}}$, we may put $E_0 = \omega A_0$

And finally we can get the imaginary part of the dielectric constant and surely the absorption coefficient. $\kappa = {{\pi e^2} \over {\epsilon_0 m^2 \omega^2}}\sum_{k,k'} |\mathbf e \cdot \mathbf p_{cv}|^2 \delta[E_c (k') - E_v (k) - \hbar \omega]\delta_{kk'}$

=== 2-body(electron-hole) Hamiltonian with EM field ===
An electron in the valence band(wave vector k) is excited by photon absorption into the conduction band(the wave vector at the band is $k'=k_e$) and leaves a hole in the valence band (the wave vector of the hole is $k_h=-k$). In this case, we include the electron-hole interaction.($V(r_e -r_h)$)

Thinking about the direct transition, $|k_e|, |k_h|$ is almost same. But Assume the slight difference of the momentum due to the photon absorption is not ignored and the bound state- electron-hole pair is very weak and the effective mass approximation is valid for the treatment. Then we can make up the following procedure, the wave function and wave vectors of the electron and hole

$\Psi_{ij} (r_e, r_h) = \psi_{ik_e}(r_e) \psi_{jk_h} (r_h)$ (i, j are the band indices, and r_{e}, r_{h}, k_{e}, k_{h} are the coordinates and wave vectors of the electron and hole respectively)

And we can take the center of mass momentum Q such that $Q = k_e + k_h.$ and define the Hamiltonian $H=H_e + H_h +V(r_e -r_h)$

Then, Bloch functions of the electron and hole can be constructed with the phase term $A^{n,Q}_{cv}$ $\Psi^{n,Q}(r_e,r_h) = \sum_{c,k_e,v,k_h}A^{n,Q}_{cv}(k_e,k_h) \psi_{ck_e}(r_e) \psi_{vk_h} (r_h)$

If V varies slowly over the distance of the integral, the term can be treated like following.

$[\Epsilon_c(k_e) + \Epsilon_h(k_h)+V(r_e-r_h)-\epsilon]A^{n,Q}_{c,V}(k_e,k_h) =0$	1

here we assume that the conduction and valence bands are parabolic with scalar masses and that at the top of the valence band $\Epsilon_v(0) =0$, i.e. $\Epsilon_c(k_e) = {{\hbar^2k_e^2} \over {2m_e}}+\Epsilon_G, \Epsilon_v(k_h)={{\hbar^2k_h^2} \over {2m_h}}$ ($\Epsilon_G$ is the energy gap)

Now, the Fourier transform of $A^{n,Q}_{cv}(k_e,k_h)$ entering Eq.(1), the effective mass equation for the exciton may be written as

$[(-{\hbar^2 \over 2M}\nabla^2)+(-{\hbar^2 \over 2\mu} \nabla^2-{e^2 \over 4\pi\epsilon r})]\Phi^{n,k}(r,R) = [\Epsilon-\Epsilon_G] \cdot \Phi^{n,Q}(r,R)$

$r=r_e-r_h, R={{m_e r_e + m_h r_h}\over {m_e+m_h}}, {1 \over \mu} = {1\over m_e}+{1 \over m_h}, M= m_e + m_h$

then the solution of eq is given by

$\Psi^{n,Q} (r,R) = \Psi_Q(R)\psi_n(r)$ $\Psi^{n,Q} (r,R) = {1 \over \sqrt {V}}\exp(iQ \cdot R) \phi_n(r)$

$\phi_n(r)$ is called the envelope function of an exciton. The ground state of the exciton is given in analogy to the hydrogen atom.

then, the dielectric function is

$\kappa_2(\omega) = {\pi e^2 \over{\epsilon_0 m^2 \omega^2}} |e \cdot p_{cv}|^2\sum_{\lambda} |\phi_\lambda(0)|^2 \delta(\Epsilon_G + \Epsilon_\lambda - \hbar\omega)$	2

detailed calculation is in.

=== Franz–Keldysh effect ===
Franz–Keldysh effect means an electron in a valence band can be allowed to be excited into a conduction band by absorbing a photon with its energy below the band gap. Now we're thinking about the effective mass equation for the relative motion of electron hole pair when the external field is applied to a crystal. But we are not to take a mutual potential of electron-hole pair into the Hamiltonian.

When the Coulomb interaction is neglected, the effective mass equation is

$\left[-{\hbar^2 \over 2\mu} \nabla^2 - eE \cdot r \right] \psi(r) = \epsilon \psi(r)$.

And the equation can be expressed,

$\left[-{\hbar^2 \over 2\mu}{d^2 \over {dr_i^2}}-eE_ir_i-\epsilon_i \right]\psi(r_i) = 0$( where $\mu_i$ is the value in the direction of the principal axis of the reduced effective mass tensor)

Using change of variables:

$\hbar\theta_i = \left({{e^2E_i^2\hbar^2} \over {2\mu_i}} \right)^{1/3}, \xi_i={{\epsilon_i+eE_ir_i}\over{\hbar\theta_i}}$

then the solution is

$\psi(\xi_x,\xi_y,\xi_z)=C_x C_y C_z Ai(-\xi_x)Ai(-\xi_y)Ai(-\xi_z)$

where $C_i = {{\sqrt{e|E_i|}}\over{\hbar\theta}}$

For example, $E_y=E_z=0, E_x$ the solution is given by

$\psi(x,y,z)=C \cdot Ai \left( {{-eEx-\epsilon+\hbar^2k_y^2/2\mu_y + \hbar^2k_z^2/2\mu_z} \over {\hbar\theta_x}} \right)$

The dielectric constant can be obtained inserting this expression into Eq.(2), and changing the summation with respect to λ to $\int_{-\infty}^{\infty}d\epsilon_xd\epsilon_yd\epsilon_z$

The integral with respect to $d\epsilon_x d\epsilon_y$ is given by the joint density of states for the two-D band. (the Joint density of states is nothing but the meaning of DOS of both electron and hole at the same time.)

${\kappa(\omega, E)} = {{\pi^2} \over{\epsilon_0 m^2 \omega^2}}|e \cdot p_{cv}|^2 {{e|E_x|} \over {\hbar\theta_x^2}}\int_{-\infty}^{\infty}{J^{2D}}_{cv}(\hbar\omega - \epsilon_G - \epsilon_x) \cdot \left|Ai\left(-{{\epsilon_x} \over {\hbar\theta}}\right)^2 \right|d\epsilon_x.$

where $J^{2D}_{cv}(\hbar\omega) = {(\mu_y\mu_z)^{1/2} \over \pi\hbar^2}, \hbar\omega > \epsilon_G.$

$=0, \hbar\omega < \epsilon_G.$

Then we put $\eta = {{\hbar\omega - \epsilon_G} \over {\hbar\theta_x}}$

And think about the case we find $\eta<<0$, thus $\hbar\omega << \epsilon_G$ with the asymptotic solution for the Airy function in this limit.

Finally,$\kappa _2(\omega, E_x) = {1/2}\kappa_2(\omega) \exp\left[-{4 \over 3}\left({{\epsilon_G-\hbar\omega} \over {\hbar\theta_x}}\right)\right]$

Therefore, the dielectric function for the incident photon energy below the band gap exist! These results indicate that absorption occurs for an incident photon.

== See also ==
- Quantum-confined Stark effect
