= Ilko Ilev =

Dr. Ilko Ilev is Senior Biomedical Research Service (SBRS) Scientist and Chief of the Optical Therapeutics and Medical Nanophotonics Laboratory with the U.S. Food and Drug Administration. He was named a Fellow of the Institute of Electrical and Electronics Engineers (IEEE) in 2014 for his contributions to the development of multifunctional optical sensing and imaging methods in biophotonics technology and medical devices. Dr. Ilev is also an elected Fellow of the Optical Society of America (OSA), the International Society for Optics and Photonics (SPIE), the American Institute for Medical and Biological Engineering (AIMBE), and the American Society for Laser Medicine and Surgery (ASLMS).
