= OPTEC =

OPTEC may refer to:

- OPTEC, printed thin-film flat disc heating element by Russell Hobbs
- OPTEC, Operational Test and Evaluation Command, predecessor of United States Army Test and Evaluation Command
- OP-TEC, the National Center for Optics and Photonics Education
- Optec Observatory, an observatory in Michigan, U.S.
