= Cape Royal Office Condominium =

Coordinates: 28.3415°N 80.609°W

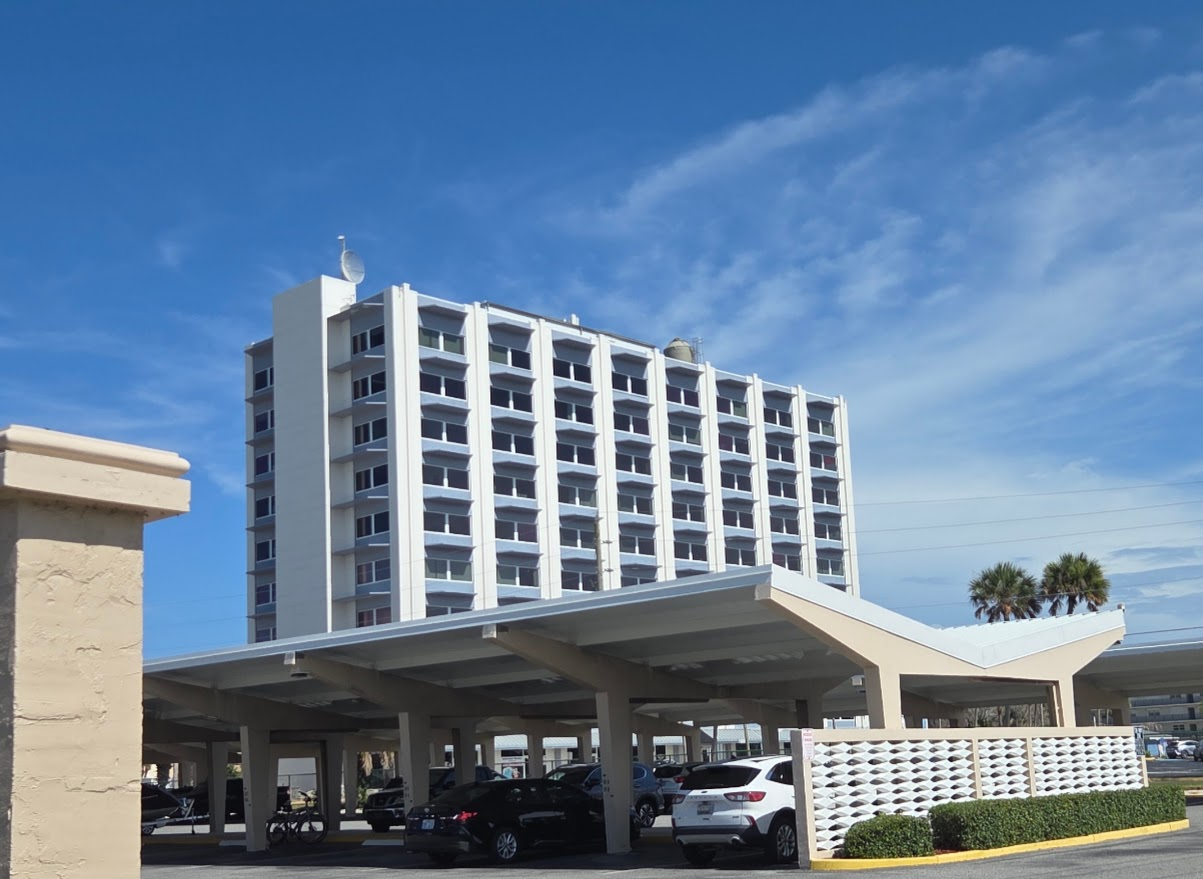
- Cape Royal Office Condominium viewed in the day from Florida State Road A1A
- Interactive map of the Cape Royal Office Condominium area

General information
- Location: Cocoa Beach, Florida, United States
- Opened: 1963
- Owner: Cape Royal Office Condominium Association, Inc.

The Cape Royal Office Condominium is a building found in Cocoa Beach, Florida, United States. The building is notable for a room lit up in red light. Ward Photonics, a biophotonics company, used the room to test the longevity of lights. As a result, the lights are on perpetually. As of 2025, the light had been on for 114,000 hours. Several fringe theories have spawned to explain the light. Ward Phototonics went out of business in 2023 and the room was acquired by Photonica USA.
