= IOWN Global Forum =

Photonics trade organization

- Formation: 2020; 6 years ago
- Type: 501(c)(6)
- President and Chairperson: Dr. Katsuhiko Kawazoe
- Website: Official website

The IOWN Global Forum is a trade association that develops technical standards for an all-photonics telecommunications network. It focuses on collaboration within its multiple committees and working groups to create Proof of Reference (PoC) documents as well as white papers, use cases, and fact sheets on the advancement of communication infrastructure. It has plans to achieve lower power consumption, higher transmission capacity and lower latency in its technology by 2030 as part of its Vision 2030 goals.

== History ==
Innovative Optical and Wireless Networks (IOWN) is an NTT led project developing IT infrastructure for networking and information processing.

Formed in 2020 by founding members NTT, Intel and Sony, the IOWN forum focuses on two key technologies to improve communication infrastructure. First, it focuses on photonics networks. An All-Photonics Network (APN) is an end-to-end optical communication system.

Dr. Katsuhiko Kawazoe is the current President and Chairperson of the IOWN Global Forum.

== Standards and Resources ==
In 2022 the forum released the functional architecture of the open All Photonics Network (APN) with the aim of creating high speed communication networks together with radio communication systems.

=== Use Cases ===
The purpose of the IOWN Global Forum's use cases is to identify the requirements of various applications that could use the contemplated next-generation optical network that the Forum is investigating. Current use cases available for the public included topics such as AI integration and cyber-physical systems.

== Membership ==
The founding members are the organizations that created the Forum in 2019 were Intel, NTT and Sony.

Number of sponsor members included Red Hat, KDDI, Cisco, Dell Technologies, Samsung and Toyota.
