= Programmable photonics =

Study of photonic circuits for computation

Programmable photonics is a subfield of photonics and optical computing that studies the development of photonic integrated circuits (PICs) for computation whose circuits can be altered at runtime to run different programs, rather than manufacturing each PIC for a specific program. Almost all modern electronic integrated circuits are programmable and thus programmable photonics is an important step in making optical computing mainstream; a non-programmable electronic integrated circuit (analogous to a non-programmable PIC) would be e.g. an ASIC that can only run inference of a specific LLM.

Programmable PICs most frequently alter their circuits at runtime by using electronics to manipulate the refractive index of specific regions/features in the lens via thermal changes, relying on the thermo-optic coefficient of the lens material. The circuits themselves usually are formed by Mach–Zehnder interferometer arrays that can perform arbitrary linear operations, e.g. Fourier transforms; other operations, such as logic gates, require nonlinear optics techniques like second-harmonic generation.
