= Co-packaged optics =

Packaging of optical transceivers with a chip in a single package

Co-packaged optics (CPO) is a semiconductor packaging technique in which optical transmitter and receiver components (optical engines) are integrated together with an application-specific integrated circuit (ASIC), such as a network switch chip, in a single package. It replaces the pluggable optical transceiver modules conventionally mounted at the edge of the circuit board and as of 2026 is being developed mainly for data centers in which large amounts of data are transferred between AI accelerators.

== Principle and advantages over electrical ==
=== Shorter electrical path ===
With pluggable modules in typical networking hardware, the electrical signal has to travel over circuit-board traces several centimeters long from the ASIC to the pluggable module. The driver circuits required for this (SerDes) consume considerable power, and the long traces degrade signal integrity. In CPO the optical components sit directly next to the ASIC on the same substrate or interposer, so electrical paths become very short.

=== Lower power consumption ===
The optical engines are usually based on silicon photonics with microring modulators and integrated photodetectors. Because silicon, as an indirect-bandgap semiconductor, hardly emits light, the lasers are generally implemented as external, replaceable light sources.

According to a 2024 review, pluggable modules require about 15–20 pJ per transmitted bit, whereas laser emitter CPO systems require about 5–10 pJ/bit.

In 2026, developments are continuing to replace laser light emitters in CPO with microLEDS arranged in arrays and coupled to the fiber channels by micro lenses, a form of space division multiplexing, to further lower power consumption down to 1 pJ/bit.

== History ==
In 2020, Intel demonstrated a prototype combining a 1.6 Tbit/s silicon-photonics engine with a 12.8 Tbit/s Ethernet switch; in 2022, Broadcom followed with a 25.6 Tbit/s CPO switch. In 2024, Broadcom introduced the 51.2 Tbit/s Bailly switch. In March 2025, Nvidia announced the Quantum-X Photonics (InfiniBand) and Spectrum-X Photonics (Ethernet) switch families, the latter with up to 400 Tbit/s of switching capacity. Nvidia and Broadcom began shipping in 2026; the market research firm TrendForce expects broad adoption in 2027–2028.

== Challenges ==
Bottlenecks include the manufacturing yield of optical engines, limited silicon-photonics production capacity, and competition with AI chips for 2.5D and 3D advanced-packaging capacity. Technical difficulties include heat dissipation at high power density, coupling optical fibers to the very narrow silicon waveguides, and serviceability, since a failed optical port inside the package cannot easily be replaced.

== See also ==
- Optical interconnect
- Optical computing
- Photonic integrated circuit
