= Bio-inspired photonics =

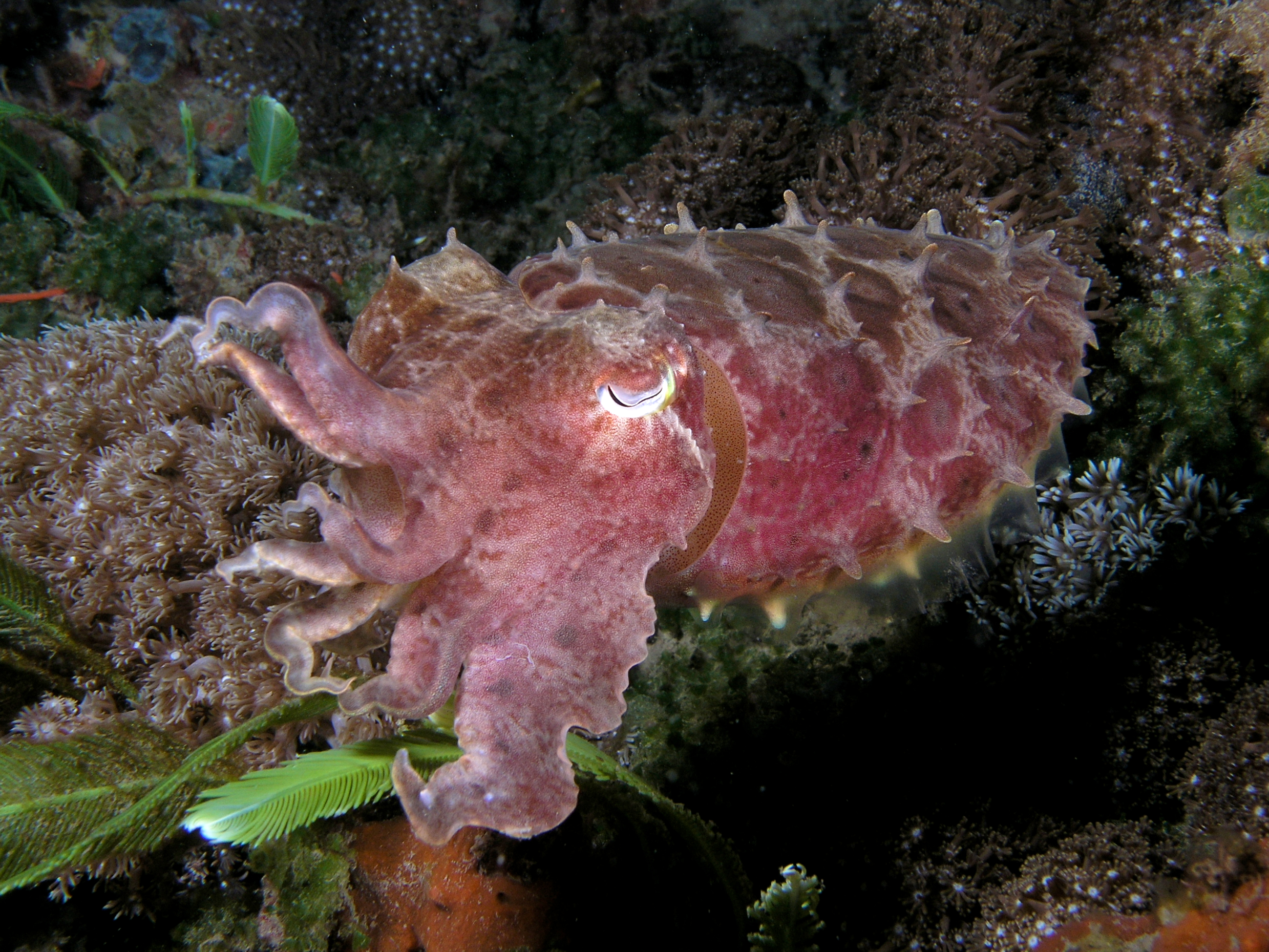
Reef cuttlefish (a cephalopod) using dynamic camouflage to blend in to its surroundings.

Bio-inspired photonics or bio-inspired optical materials are the application of biomimicry (the use of natural models, systems, and elements for human innovations) to the field of photonics (the science and application of light generation, detection, and manipulation). This differs slightly from biophotonics which is the study and manipulation of light to observe its interactions with biology. One area that inspiration may be drawn from is structural color, which allows color to appear as a result of the detailed material structure. Other inspiration can be drawn from both static and dynamic camouflage in animals like the chameleon or some cephalopods. Scientists have also been looking to recreate the ability to absorb light using molecules from various plants and microorganisms. Pulling from these heavily evolved constructs allows engineers to improve and optimize existing photonic technologies, whilst also solving existing problems within this field.

== History ==
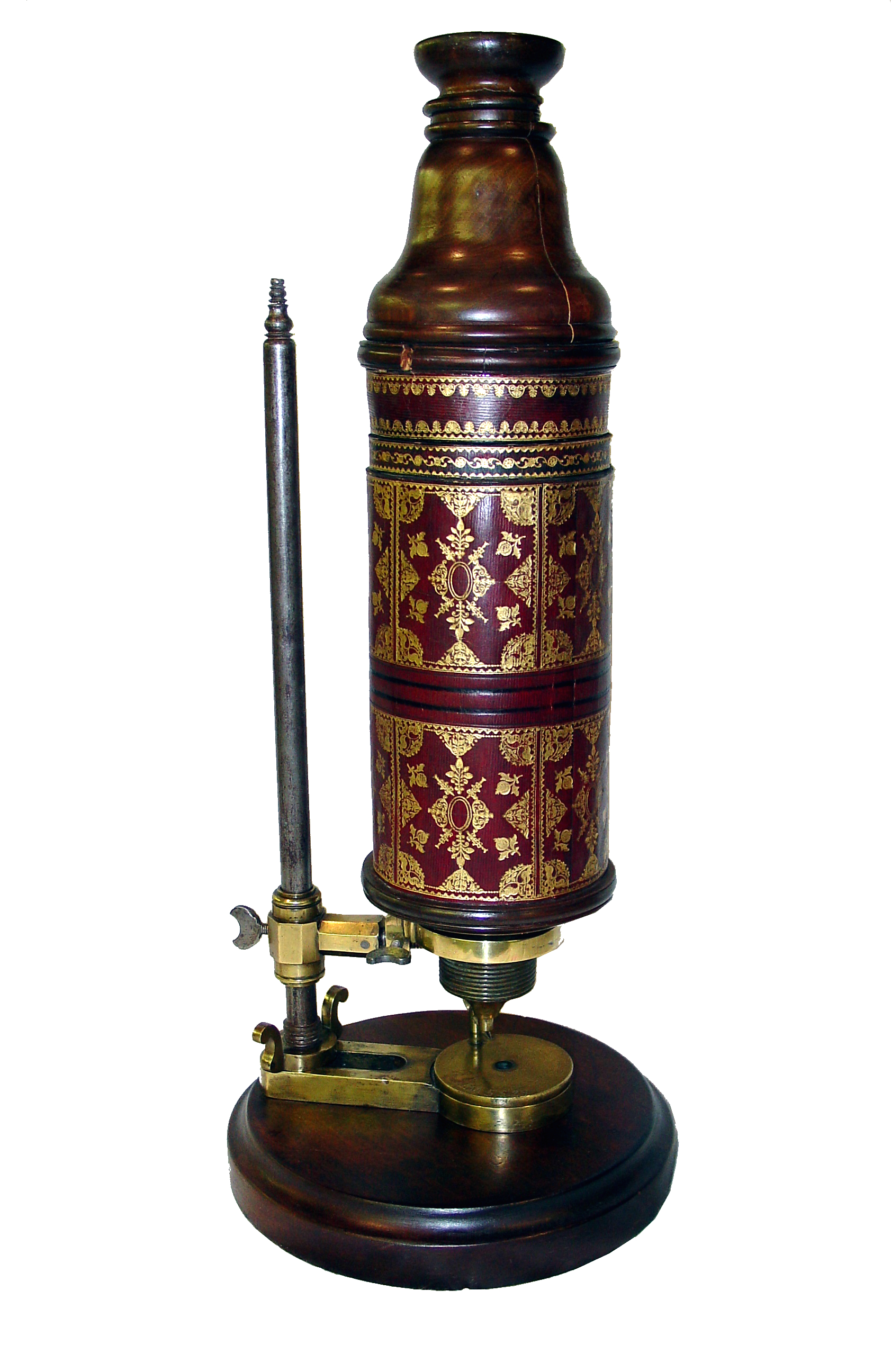
The microscope used by Robert Hooke to make the observations he made in the text Micrographia. It is displayed in the National Museum of Health and Medicine (Washington DC).

One of the earliest encounters with biological photonics was as early as the 6th century B.C.E (before common era). The Greek philosopher Anaximander, widely regarded as the first scientist, had a student named Anaximenes, who had the first documented mention of bioluminescence. He described seeing a glow in the water when striking it with an oar. Similarly, Aristotle also experienced the same phenomena, which he documented in works like Meteorologica and De Coloribus. He mentions seeing "things which are neither fire nor forms of fire seem to produce light by nature."

Although it was experienced that early, there was still no explanation to why it was occurring. It was not until the early microscopes, utilized by Robert Hooke in the mid-1600s, that allowed humans to observe nature in greater detail. Hooke himself published what he had seen in the text Micrographia in 1665. Here he describes various biological structures such as the feathers of colorful birds, wing and eyes of flies, and pearlescent scales of silverfish. This ability to look at the microstructures of nature, gave scientists information on the mechanisms behind the interactions between biology and light. The Theorie of Imperfection, published by the Russian biophysicist Zhuravlev and American biochemist Seliger, is the first working hypothesis about the ultra-weak emission of photons by biological systems. Further developments in microscopy, like scanning electron microscopy (SEM), only increased this and would allow scientists to mimic these observed structures.

In addition, the concept of biomimicry was spurred by many scientists, including Leonardo da Vinci. He spent a great deal of time studying the anatomy of birds and their flight capabilities. As demonstrated by various sketches and notes he left behind, he even attempted to create a "flying machine". Although unsuccessful, it was one of the earliest examples of biomimicry.

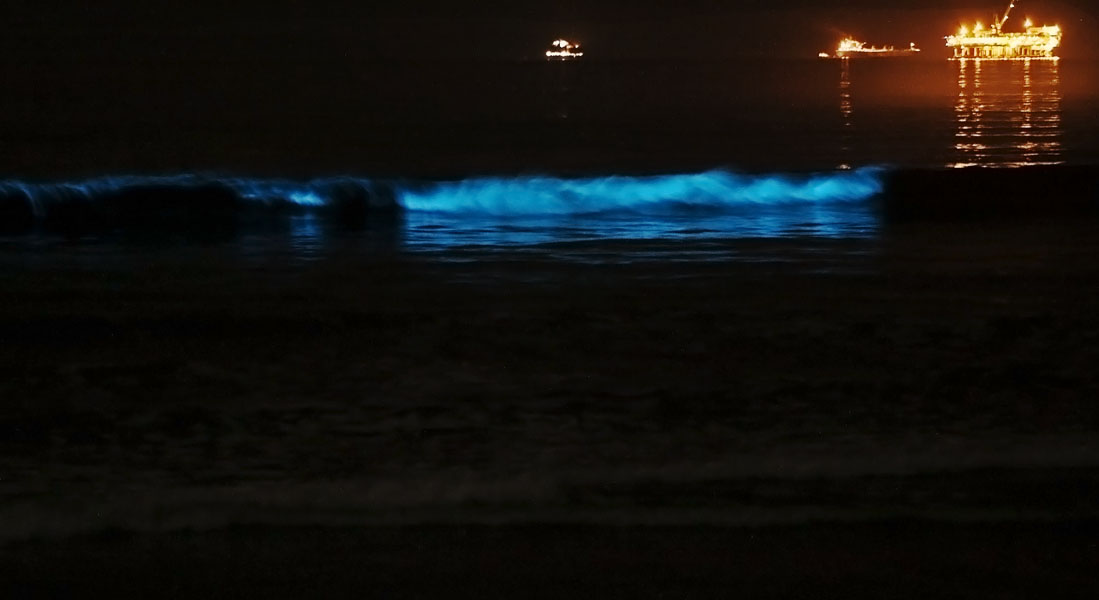
Dinoflagellate (a type of marine plankton) bioluminescence in sea water when agitated by waves

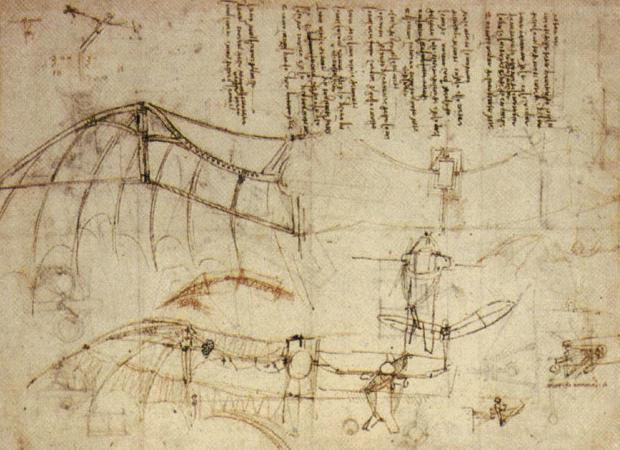
A drawing from Leonardo da Vinci for a theorized "flying machine" to mimic the flight of birds

== Molecular biomimetics ==
Molecular biomimetics involves the design of optical materials based on specific molecules and/or macromolecules to induce coloration. Molecularly Imprinted Polymers (MIPs) are specifically aimed at sensing macromolecules. They can also form them into specific structures that change color. Pigment-inspired materials aiming for specific molecular light absorption have been developed as for example melanin-inspired films prepared by polymerization of melanin precursors such as dopamine and 5,6-dihydroxyindole to provoke color saturation. Polydopamine is a synthetic polymer with color properties similar to melanin. It can also act to enhance the vibrancy and stability of structural colors. Materials based on the multi-layer stacking of guanine molecular crystals found in living organisms (e.g. fish and chameleons) have been proposed as potential reflective coatings and solar reflectors. Protein-based optical materials, for instance self-assembling reflectin proteins found in cephalopods and silk, have incited interest in artificial materials for camouflage systems, electronic paper (e-paper) and biomedical applications. Non-protein biological macromolecules such as DNA have also been utilized for bio-inspired optics. The most abundant biopolymer on earth, cellulose, has been also utilized as a principal component for bio-optics. Modification of wood or other cellulose sources can mitigate scattering and absorption of light leading to optically interesting materials such as transparent wood and paper. Modification of living tissue properties using combined irradiation may change their biological responses and physiological relevance. Pressure and solvent polarity affect the color of a manufactured cellulose membrane, to the point of detection by the naked eye. Cellulose can also be used as nanofibrils or nanocrystals after treatments. One such treatment involves a nitrating agent to form nitrocellulose. Cellulose nanocrystals can polarize light.

== Bioinspired periodic/aperiodic structures ==
Structural color is a type of coloration that arises from the interaction of light with nano-sized structures. This interaction is possible because these photonic structures are of the same size as the wavelength of light. Through a mechanism of constructive and destructive interference, certain colors get amplified, while others diminish.

Photonic structures are abundant in nature, existing in a wide range of organisms. Different organisms use different structures, each with a different morphology designed to obtain the desired effect. Examples of this are the photonic crystal underlying the bright colors in peacock feathers or the tree-like structures responsible for the bright blue in some Morpho butterflies.

An example of bio-inspired photonics using structures is the so-called moth eye. Moths have a structure of ordered cylinders in their eyes that do not produce color, but instead reduce reflectivity. This concept has led to creation of antireflective coatings.

A combination of chemical structure and how it interacts with visible light creates color within organisms' nature. The creation of specific biological photonics requires identifying the chemical components of the structure, the optical response created by the physics and the structure's function. The complex structures created by nature can range from simple, quasi-ordered structures to hierarchical complex formations.

=== 2-D Structures ===
==== Simple Array Structure (Peacock Feathers) ====
Nature sometimes manipulates the nanostructure, such as its crystal lattice parameters in order to create its patterns and colors. The Barbule (the individual strands of a feather that hold its color) of the peacock is made of an outer layer of keratin and an inner layer containing an array of melanin rods connected by keratin with holes separating them. When the melanin rods are parallel to the lattice arrangement of the structure of the keratin outer layer it creates the brown color. The rest of the colors of the feather are created by changing the spacing of the melanin layers.

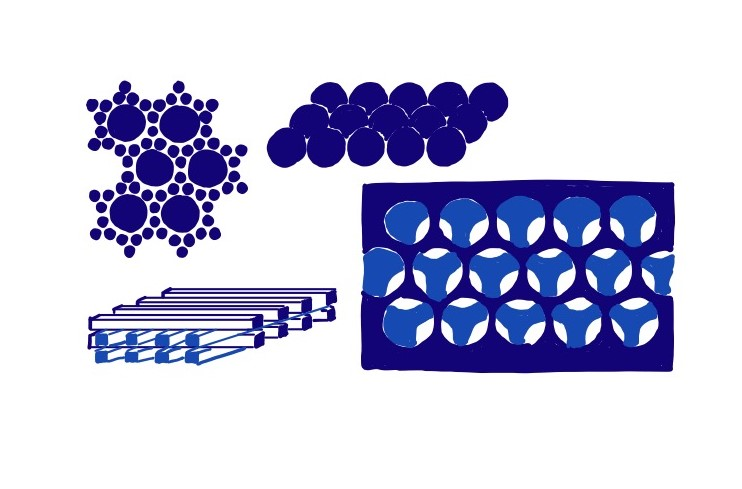
Multiple types of structures present in bio photonics

==== Aperiodic Photonic Structures ====
Aperiodic Photonic Structures do not have a unit cell and are capable of creating band gaps without the requirement of a high index of refraction difference. Also known as quasi-ordered crystal structure creates blue and green coloring.

=== 3-D Structures ===
==== Helicoidal Multilayers ====
These are twisted multilayers where fibers are aligned in the same direction and each layer they are slightly rotated. This structure allows nature to reflect polarized light and creates an intense value due to Bragg reflection.

== Application Examples ==
=== Bioinspired antibacterial structural color hydrogel ===
As a form of application, biophotonics are used in order to indicate antibacterial and self-healing properties. Since the existence of silver nanoparticles prevent bacterial adhesion (there is already bacteria existing in the hydrogel) it causes hydrogel degradation and color fading. This allows for the engineered hydrogel to display with color its integrity after self-healing.

=== Photonic nanoarchitectures in butterflies and beetles ===
Nanoarchitectures contribute to the iridescence of butterflies and beetles. Multilayers are common, typically in a 1-D or 3-D structure, 2-D structures are more rare. Disorder and irregularity in the structure are "intentional" and adapted to the habitat. The structure has been successfully recreated and can be used as a coating. It is also used in some applications where stable, vibrant color is required. It is flexible enough that it can be designed to have a pattern.

=== Mimicking fireflies to improve LED efficiency ===
When observing fireflies (Photuris sp.) using SEM, it was observed that their light emitting cuticle had a specific 2D periodic structure. It is structured following a "factory roof" like pattern with scales oriented at a tilted slope and a sharp edge on the protruding side of the scales. When modeling a similar structure using a photoresist layer on light emitting diodes (LEDs), it resulted in a 68% power increase and 55% increase in light extraction efficiency (LEE). This technology reduces the amount of energy consumed to produce the same amount of light.

== Responsive materials ==
Responsive materials are materials or devices that can respond to external stimuli as they occur. A little bit of time is taken to adjust to the new surroundings, but the idea remains consistent with what is seen in nature. The most commonly used examples are the chameleon or octopus, as their responsive skin allows them to change the color or even the texture of their skin. The mechanisms behind these tactics are called chromatophores, which are pigment-filled sacs that uses muscles and nerves to change the animal's external appearance. These chromatophores are activated by neuronal activity, so an animal can change its color just by thinking about it. The animal uses another mechanism to be able to know what color or shape to take; a photo-sensitive cell within their skin called opsin is able to detect light (and possibly color). The animal can use these opsins to their advantage to quickly assess their surroundings, before turning on their chromatophores to accurately camouflage to their circumstances.

A lot of creatures have camouflage incorporated into their bodies — take the fish in the figure on the right for example. In this hypothetical, the animal can appear in two different ways depending on their surroundings: in the middle of the ocean away from all solid objects, it can appear near-translucent; near the sea floor where potential predators will only sense it from above, it can turn darker to naturally blend in with the rocky bottom. Many fish, such as the marine hatchetfish, use a combination of camouflage techniques to achieve these appearances. Silvering, a common tactic, utilizes highly reflective scales to reflect the surrounding light effectively enough to make the scales appear invisible from the side. Counterillumination, a tactic used more by deep-sea dwellers, uses a luminous organ located in the bottom of the body to emit light in order to appear brighter from underneath. At this angle, the light emitted is at an intensity meant to replicate the sunlight as it appears on the surface of the water. Thus, from below the creature is essentially invisible to many predators.

Within the luminous organ is a laminar structure of photocytes and nerve branches, with relatively small gap junctions between them. It is thought that the vast interconnectivity and the layered structure of these neuro-photocyte units is what allows a deep-sea fish to rapidly respond to a situation with spontaneous luminescence. Because all of the nerves are directly connected to the spinal cord (and by extension, the brain), researchers believe that electronic signals can trigger these photocytes to react. With this line of thinking, scientists are working to develop technology using this type of neuro-photocyte unit.

These biologically inspired materials can be applied in many different circumstances. This technology can be used to camouflage objects, create a device that can mold its shape yet still retain its desired properties, or even help people in relation to biomedical applications. A coating of this technology can help incorporate a foreign body into a living ecosystem, i.e. a human body. The technology of this device allows a person's antibodies to detect the new object as a non-threat, thus permitting easier acceptance of manmade tools into the body, such as a cardiac pacing device to the chest.
