= OP-TEC =

The National Center for Optics and Photonics Education (OP-TEC) was a joint effort by educational institutions and other groups to develop curriculum materials for photonics. Headquartered in Waco, Texas, it was funded by the National Science Foundation.

OP-TEC held workshops at various institutions around the United States to promote the use of optics and photonics in secondary and post-secondary curricula.
