= Biophotonics =

Optical techniques for the study of biology

Biophotonics refers to the intersection between the fields of biology and photonics, with photonics being the science and technology of generation, manipulation, and detection of photons, quantum units of light. Photonics is related to electronics and photons. Photons play a central role in information technologies, such as fiber optics, the way electrons do in electronics.

Biophotonics can also be described as the "development and application of optical techniques, particularly imaging, to the study of biological molecules, cells and tissue". One of the main benefits of using the optical techniques which make up biophotonics is that they preserve the integrity of the biological cells being examined.

Biophotonics has therefore become the established general term for all techniques that deal with the interaction between biological items and photons. This refers to emission, detection, absorption, reflection, modification, and creation of radiation from biomolecular, cells, tissues, organisms, and biomaterials. These techniques are applied in the life sciences, medicine, agriculture, and environmental science. Similar to the differentiation between "electric" and "electronics," a difference can be made between applications such as therapy and surgery, which use light mainly to transfer energy, and applications such as diagnostics, which use light to excite matter and to transfer information back to the operator. In most cases, the term biophotonics refers to the latter type of application.

Nanobiophotonics is the specialization of biophotonics in the nanoscale.

== Applications ==
Biophotonics is an interdisciplinary field involving the interaction between electromagnetic radiation and biological materials such as tissues, cells, sub-cellular structures, and molecules in living organisms.

Recent biophotonics research has allowed for less invasive diagnostics for vascular and blood flow, along with more effective examination of skin lesions, in addition to new diagnostic tools, and new photothermal, photodynamic, and tissue therapies.

=== Raman and FT-IR based diagnostics ===
Raman and FTIR spectroscopy can be applied in many different ways towards improved diagnostics. For example:

1. Identifying bacterial and fungal infections
2. Tissue tumor assessment in: skin, liver, bones, bladder etc.
3. Identifying antibiotic resistances

=== Other applications ===
==== Dermatology ====
By observing the numerous and complex interactions between light and biological materials, the field of biophotonics presents a unique set of diagnostic techniques that medical practitioners can utilize. Biophotonic imaging provides the field of dermatology with the only non-invasive technique available for diagnosing skin cancers. Traditional diagnostic procedures for skin cancers involve visual assessment and biopsy, but a new laser-induced fluorescence spectroscopy technique allow dermatologists to compare spectrographs of a patient's skin with spectrographs known to correspond with malignant tissue. This provides doctors with earlier diagnosis and treatment options.

"Among optical techniques, an emerging imaging technology based on laser scanning, the optical coherence tomography or OCT imaging is considered to be a useful tool to differentiate healthy from malignant skin tissue". The information is immediately accessible and eliminates the need for skin excision. This also eliminates the need for the skin samples to be processed in a lab, which reduces labor costs and processing time.

Furthermore, these optical imaging technologies can be used during traditional surgical procedures to determine the boundaries of lesions to ensure that the entirety of the diseased tissue is removed. This is accomplished by exposing nanoparticles that have been dyed with a fluorescing substance to the acceptable light photons. Nanoparticles that are functionalized with fluorescent dyes and marker proteins will congregate in a chosen tissue type. When the particles are exposed to wavelengths of light that correspond to the fluorescent dye, the unhealthy tissue glows. This allows for the attending surgeon to quickly visually identify boundaries between healthy and unhealthy tissue, resulting in less time on the operating table and higher patient recovery. "Using dielectrophoretic microarray devices, nanoparticles and DNA biomarkers were rapidly isolated and concentrated onto specific microscopic locations where they were easily detected by epifluorescent microscopy".

==== Optical tweezers ====
Optical tweezers (or traps) are scientific tools employed to maneuver microscopic particles such as atoms, DNA, bacteria, viruses, and other types of nanoparticles. They use the light's momentum to exert small forces on a sample. This technique allows for the organizing and sorting of cells, the tracking of the movement of bacteria, and the changing of cell structure.

==== Laser micro-scalpel ====
Laser micro-scalpels are a combination of fluorescence microscopy and a femtosecond laser can penetrate up to 250 micrometers into tissue and target single cells in 3D space. The technology, which was patented by researchers at the University of Texas at Austin, allows surgeons to excise diseased or damaged cells without disturbing or damaging healthy surrounding cells in delicate surgeries involving areas such as the eyes and vocal chords.

==== Photoacoustic microscopy (PAM) ====
Photoacoustic microscopy (PAM) is an imaging technology that utilizes both laser technology and ultrasound technology. This dual imaging modality is far superior at imaging deep tissue and vascular tissues than previous imaging technologies. The improvement in resolution provides higher quality images of deep tissues and vascular systems, allowing non-invasive differentiation of cancerous tissues vs healthy tissue by observing such things as water content, oxygen saturation level, and hemoglobin concentration. Researchers have also been able to use PAM to diagnose endometriosis in rats.

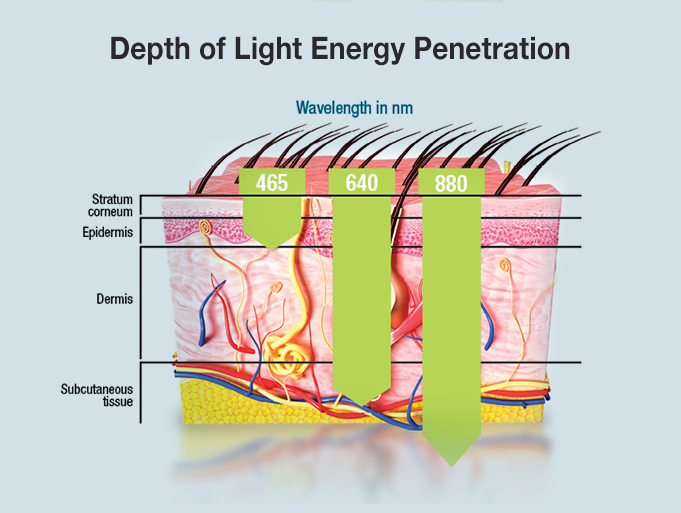
Shows the depth of penetration of light through human skin

==== Low level laser therapy (LLLT) ====
Although low-level laser therapy's (LLLT) efficacy is somewhat controversial, the technology can be used to treat wounds by repairing tissue and preventing tissue death. However, more recent studies indicate that LLLT is more useful for reducing inflammation and assuaging chronic joint pain. In addition, it is believed that LLLT could possibly prove to be useful in the treatment of severe brain injury or trauma, stroke, and degenerative neurological diseases.

==== Photodynamic therapy (PT) ====
Photodynamic therapy (PT) uses photosynthesizing chemicals and oxygen to induce a cellular reaction to light. It can be used to kill cancer cells, treat acne, and reduce scarring. PT can also kill bacteria, viruses, and fungi. The technology provides treatment with little to no long-term side effects, is less invasive than surgery, and can be repeated more often than radiation. Treatment is limited, however, to surfaces and organs that can be exposed to light, which means it cannot be used in deep tissue cancer treatments.

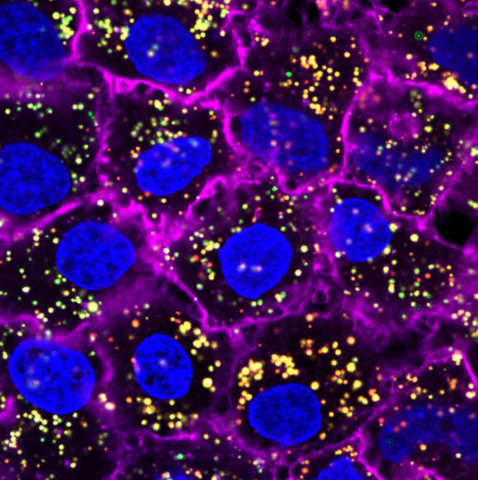
Nano particles injected into a tumor to use photothermal therapy

==== Photothermal therapy ====
Photothermal therapy most commonly uses nanoparticles made of a noble metal to convert light into heat. The nanoparticles are engineered to absorb light in the 700–1000 nm range, where the human body is optically transparent. When the particles are hit by light they heat up, disrupting or destroying the surrounding cells via hyperthermia. Because the light used does not interact with tissue directly, photothermal therapy has few long term side effects and it can be used to treat cancers deep within the body.

== FRET ==
Fluorescence resonance energy transfer, also known as Förster resonance energy transfer (FRET in both cases) is the term given to the process where two excited "fluorophores" pass energy one to the other non-radiatively (i.e., without exchanging a photon). By carefully selecting the excitation of these fluorophores and detecting the emission, FRET has become one of the most widely used techniques in the field of biophotonics, giving scientists the chance to investigate sub-cellular environments.

== Biotic light ==
=== Biofluorescence ===
Biofluorescence describes the absorption of ultraviolet or visible light and the subsequent emission of photons at a lower energy level ($S_1$ excited state relaxes to $S_0$ ground state) by intrinsically fluorescent proteins or by synthetic fluorescent molecules covalently attached to a biomarker of interest. Biomarkers are molecules indicative or disease or distress and are a typically monitored systemically in a living organism, or by using an ex vivo tissue sample for microscopy, or in vitro: in the blood, urine, sweat, saliva, interstitial fluid, aqueous humor, or sputum. Stimulating light excites an electron, raising energy to an unstable level. This instability is unfavorable, so the energized electron is returned to a stable state almost immediately after it becomes unstable. The time delay between excitation and re-emission that occurs when returning to the stable ground state causes the photon that is re-emitted to be a different color (i.e. it relaxes to a lower energy and thus the photon emitted is at a shorter wavelength, as governed by the Plank-Einstein relation $E={\frac {hc}{\lambda }}$) than the excitation light that was absorbed. This return to stability corresponds with the release of excess energy in the form of fluorescent light. This emission of light is only observable whilst the excitation light is still providing photons to the fluorescent molecule and is typically excited by blue or green light and emits purple, yellow, orange, green, cyan, or red. Biofluorescence is often confused with bioluminescence and biophosphorescence, which are other forms of biotic light.

=== Bioluminescence ===
Bioluminescence differs from biofluorescence in that it is the natural production of light by chemical reactions within an organism, whereas biofluorescence and biophosphorescence are the absorption and re-emission of light from the natural environment.

=== Biophosphorescence ===
Biophosphorescence is similar to biofluorescence in its requirement of light at specified wavelengths as a provider of excitation energy. It differs in the relative stability of the energized electron. Unlike with biofluorescence, the electron retains stability in the forbidden triplet state (unpaired spins), with a longer delay in emitting light, making it seem to continue to “glow-in-the-dark” even long after the stimulating light source has been removed.

== Biolasing ==
A biolaser is a laser light generated by or from within a living cell. Imaging in biophotonics often relies on laser light, and integration with biological systems is seen as a promising route to enhancing sensing and imaging techniques. Biolasers, like any lasers, require three components: a gain medium, an optical feedback structure and a pump source. For the gain medium, a variety of naturally produced fluorescent proteins can be used in different laser structure. Enclosing an optical feedback structure in a cell has been demonstrated using cell vacuoles, as well as using fully enclosed laser systems such as dye doped polymer microspheres, or semiconductor nanodisks lasers.

== Light sources ==
The predominantly used light sources in biophotonics are beam lights. LEDs and superluminescent diodes also play an important role. The wavelengths typically used in biophotonics are between 600 nm (visible) and 3000 nm (near IR).

=== Lasers ===
Lasers are an important light-based tool in biophotonics. They have several unique intrinsic properties which make suitable for a wide range of applications; for example, they have precise wavelength selection, wide wavelength coverage, high focusability (and thus high spectral resolution), strong power densities, and a broad spectrum of excitation periods. As a result, a variety of different laser technologies from a broad number of suppliers can be found in the market today.

==== Gas lasers ====
Major gas lasers used for biophotonics applications, and their most important wavelengths, are:

- Argon Ion laser: 457.8 nm, 476.5 nm, 488.0 nm, 496.5 nm, 501.7 nm, 514.5 nm (multi-line operation possible)
- Krypton Ion laser: 350.7 nm, 356.4 nm, 476.2 nm, 482.5 nm, 520.6 nm, 530.9 nm, 568.2 nm, 647.1 nm, 676.4 nm, 752.5 nm, 799.3 nm
- Helium–neon laser: 632.8 nm (543.5 nm, 594.1 nm, 611.9 nm)
- HeCd lasers: 325 nm, 442 nm

Other commercial gas lasers like carbon dioxide (CO_{2}), carbon monoxide, nitrogen, oxygen, xenon-ion, excimer or metal vapor lasers have no or only very minor importance in biophotonics. A major advantage of using gas lasers in biophotonics is their fixed wavelength, their perfect beam quality and their low linewidth/high coherence. Argon ion lasers can also operate in multi-line mode. However, they also require high power consumption, generate significant mechanical noise due to fan cooling, and have limited laser powers. Key suppliers are Coherent, CVI/Melles Griot, JDSU, Lasos, LTB and Newport/Spectra Physics.

==== Diode lasers ====
The most commonly integrated laser diodes that are used for diode lasers in biophotonics are based either on GaN or GaAs semiconductor material. GaN covers a wavelength spectrum from 375 to 488 nm (commercial products at 515 have been announced recently) whereas GaAs covers a wavelength spectrum starting from 635 nm.

The most commonly used wavelengths from diode lasers in biophotonics are: 375, 405, 445, 473, 488, 515, 640, 643, 660, 675 and 785 nm.

Laser diodes are available in 4 classes:

1. Single edge emitter/broad stripe/broad area
2. Surface emitter/VCSEL
3. Edge emitter/Ridge waveguide
4. Grating stabilized (FDB, DBR, ECDL)

For biophotonic applications, the most commonly used laser diodes are edge-emitting/ridge waveguide diodes, which are single transverse mode and can be optimized to an almost perfect TEM00 beam quality. Due to the small size of the resonator, digital modulation can be very fast (up to 500 MHz). Coherence length is low (typically < 1 mm) and the typical linewidth is in the nm-range. Typical power levels are around 100 mW (depending on wavelength and supplier). Key suppliers are: Coherent, Melles Griot, Omicron, Toptica, JDSU, Newport, Oxxius, Power Technology. Grating stabilized diode lasers either have an lithographical incorporated grating (DFB, DBR) or an external grating (ECDL). As a result, the coherence length will raise into the range of several meters, whereas the linewidth will drop well below picometers (pm). Biophotonic applications, which make use of this characteristics are Raman spectroscopy (requires linewidth below cm-1) and spectroscopic gas sensing.

==== Solid-state lasers ====
Solid-state lasers are lasers based on solid-state gain media, such as crystals or glasses doped with rare earth or transition metal ions, or semiconductor lasers. (Although semiconductor lasers are also solid-state devices, they are often not included in the term solid-state lasers.) Ion-doped solid-state lasers (also sometimes called doped insulator lasers) can be made in the form of bulk lasers, fiber lasers, or other types of waveguide lasers. Solid-state lasers may generate output powers between a few milliwatts and (in high-power versions) many kilowatts.

==== Ultrachrome lasers ====
Many advanced applications in biophotonics require individually selectable light at multiple wavelengths. As a consequence a series of new laser technologies has been introduced, which currently looks for precise wording.

The most commonly used terminology are supercontinuum lasers, which emit visible light over a wide spectrum simultaneously. This light is then filtered e.g. via acousto-optic modulators (AOM, AOTF) into 1 or up to 8 different wavelengths. Typical suppliers for this technology was NKT Photonics or Fianium. Recently NKT Photonics bought Fianium, remaining the major supplier of the supercontinuum technology on the market.

In another approach (Toptica/iChrome) the supercontinuum is generated in the infrared and then converted at a single selectable wavelength into the visible regime. This approach does not require AOTF's and has a background-free spectral purity.

Since both concepts have major importance for biophotonics the umbrella term "ultrachrome lasers" is often used.

==== Swept sources ====
Swept sources are designed to continuously change ('sweep') emitted light frequency in time. They typically continuously circle through a pre-defined range of frequencies (e.g., 800 ± 50 nm). Swept sources in the terahertz regime have been demonstrated. A typical application of swept sources in biophotonics is optical coherence tomography (OCT) imaging.

==== THz sources ====
Vibrational spectroscopy in the terahertz (THz) frequency range, 0.1–10 THz, is a fast emerging technique for fingerprinting biological molecules and species. For more than 20 years, theoretical studies predicted multiple resonances in absorption (or transmission) spectra of biological molecules in this range. THz radiation interacts with the low-frequency internal molecular vibrations by exciting these vibrations.

=== Single photon sources ===
Single photon sources are novel types of light sources—distinct from coherent light sources (lasers) and thermal light sources (such as incandescent light bulbs and mercury-vapor lamps)—that emit light as single particles or photons.

== See also ==
- Bio-inspired photonics
