= Lanthanum manganite =

Perovskite compound

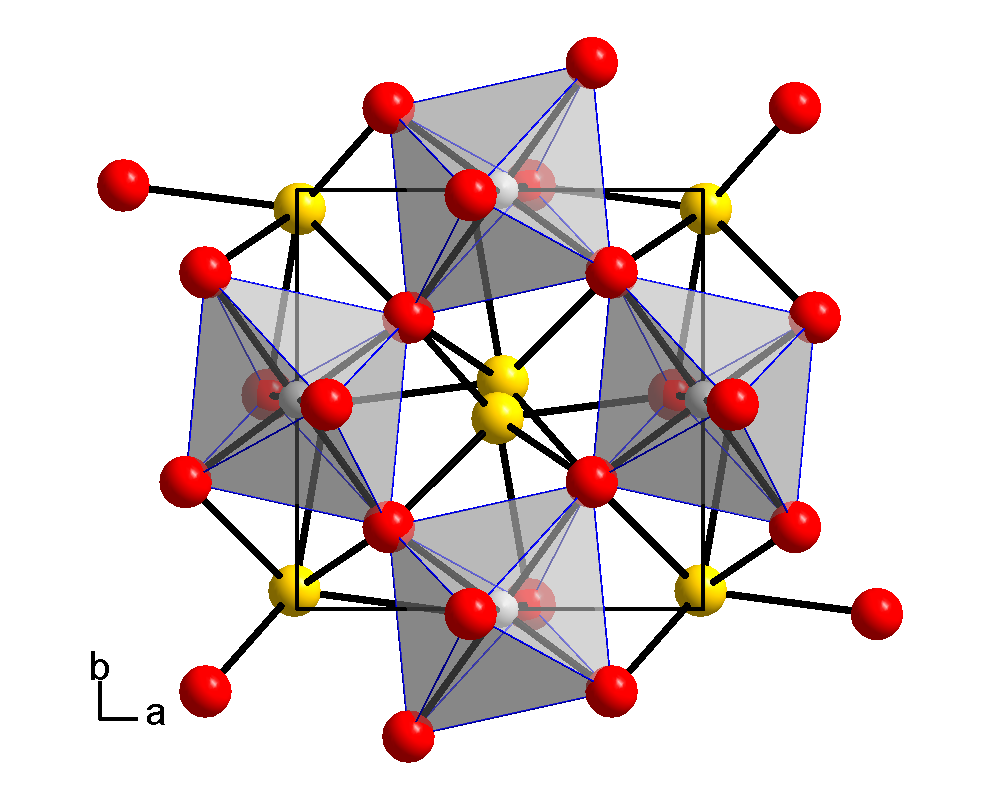

Identifiers
CAS Number	12031-12-8
3D model (JSmol)	Interactive image
- InChI: InChI=1S/La.Mn.3O/q2*+3;3*-2 Key: JBZIKYYYMXDQRI-UHFFFAOYSA-N
- SMILES: [La+3].[Mn+3].[O-2].[O-2].[O-2]

Properties
Chemical formula	LaMnO_{3}
Molar mass	241.84 g/mol
- Except where otherwise noted, data are given for materials in their standard state (at 25 °C [77 °F], 100 kPa). Infobox references

Lanthanum manganite is an inorganic compound with the formula LaMnO_{3}, often abbreviated as LMO. Lanthanum manganite is formed in the perovskite structure, consisting of oxygen octahedra with a central Mn atom. The cubic perovskite structure is distorted into an orthorhombic structure by a strong Jahn–Teller distortion of the oxygen octahedra.

LaMnO_{3} often has lanthanum vacancies as evidenced by neutron scattering. For this reason, this material is usually referred as LaMnO_{3+ẟ}. These vacancies generate a structure with a rhombohedral unit cell in this perovskite. At temperatures below 140 K, this LaMnO_{3+ẟ} semiconductor exhibit a ferromagnetic order.

== Synthesis ==
Lanthanum manganite can be prepared via solid-state reactions at high temperatures, using their oxides or carbonates. An alternative method is to use lanthanum nitrate and manganese nitrate as raw materials. The reaction occurs at high temperature after the solvents are vaporized.

== Lanthanum manganite alloys ==
Lanthanum manganite is an electrical insulator and an A-type antiferromagnet. It is the parent compound of several important alloys, often termed rare-earth manganites or colossal magnetoresistance oxides. These families include lanthanum strontium manganite, lanthanum calcium manganite and others.

In lanthanum manganite, both the La and the Mn are in the +3 oxidation state. Substitution of some of the La atoms by divalent atoms such as Sr or Ca induces a similar amount of tetravalent Mn^{4+} ions. Such substitution, or doping can induce various electronic effects, which form the basis of a rich and complex electron correlation phenomena that yield diverse electronic phase diagrams in these alloys.

== See also ==
- Super exchange
- Double exchange
- Jahn–Teller effect
- Electron correlation
