= Lanthanum strontium manganite =

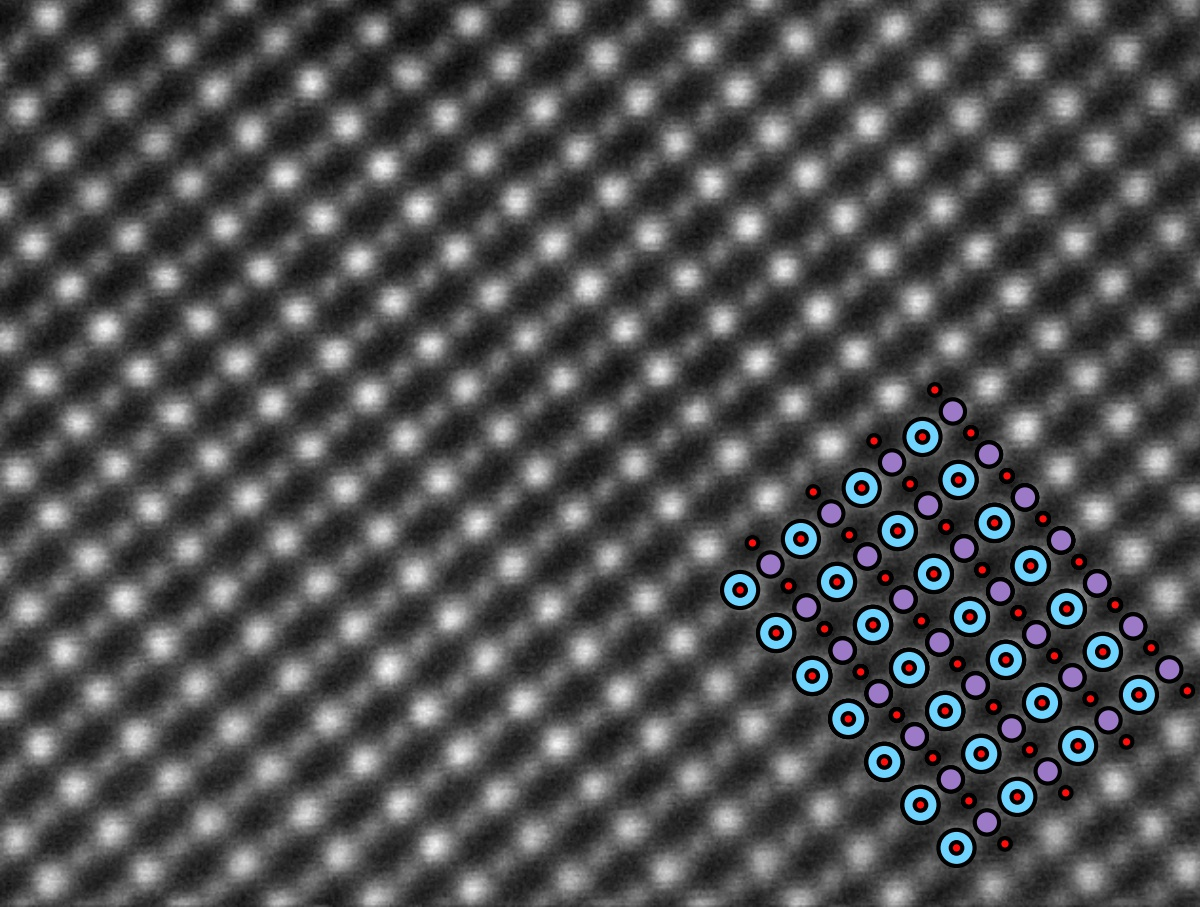
Atomic-resolution scanning transmission electron microscopy image of La_{0.7}Sr_{0.3}MnO_{3} obtained using an annular dark-field detector. Overlay: lanthanum/strontium (blue), manganese (purple), oxygen (red).

Lanthanum strontium manganite (LSMO) is a mixed-valence perovskite oxide with the general formula La_{1−x}Sr_{x}MnO_{3}, where x denotes the fraction of lanthanum ions replaced by strontium. LSMO belongs to the family of rare-earth manganites and exhibits a rich range of structural, electronic, and magnetic properties as a function of composition, temperature, and applied magnetic field.

LSMO adopts the ABO_{3} perovskite structure, in which lanthanum and strontium occupy the A-sites and manganese occupies the B-sites. Substitution of Sr^{2+} for La^{3+} introduces holes into the Mn–O network and changes the average manganese oxidation state from Mn^{3+} toward Mn^{4+}. This hole doping strongly modifies the electrical conductivity and magnetic ordering of the material.

== History ==
The parent compound lanthanum manganite (LaMnO_{3}) was investigated in the mid-20th century as part of broader studies of transition-metal oxides with perovskite structures. In 1951, Clarence Zener proposed the double-exchange mechanism to explain ferromagnetism and metallic conductivity in mixed-valence manganites containing both Mn^{3+} and Mn^{4+} ions.

Systematic investigations of La_{1−x}Sr_{x}MnO_{3} during the 1960s and 1970s established that replacing La with Sr transforms insulating antiferromagnetic LaMnO_{3} into a ferromagnetic conductor over a broad composition range. Interest in LSMO increased substantially in the 1990s following the discovery of colossal magnetoresistance (CMR) in doped manganites, which revealed strong coupling between charge, spin, orbital, and lattice degrees of freedom.

Today, LSMO is one of the most extensively studied manganites owing to its high Curie temperature, half-metallic character near optimal doping, and applications in spintronics and oxide electronics.

== Structure ==
Depending on the Sr concentration, LSMO may adopt rhombohedral, orthorhombic, cubic, or hexagonal crystal symmetries. These structural changes are commonly interpreted in terms of the Goldschmidt tolerance factor, which varies with the average A-site ionic radius. Increasing Sr content reduces lattice distortions and modifies the Mn–O–Mn bond angles that govern magnetic exchange interactions.

Changes in the manganese oxidation state can be observed using spectroscopic techniques such as X-ray photoelectron spectroscopy (XPS), where the Mn 2p_{3/2} peak shifts systematically with composition.

== Electronic and magnetic properties ==
LSMO exhibits one of the most extensively studied phase diagrams among transition-metal oxides. The electronic and magnetic ground states depend strongly on the Sr concentration x.

For x = 0, LaMnO_{3} is an antiferromagnetic insulator with cooperative Jahn–Teller distortions associated with Mn^{3+} ions. Introducing Sr generates Mn^{4+} ions and activates the double-exchange interaction between neighboring manganese sites. As a result, electrical conductivity increases and ferromagnetic order emerges.

In the range approximately 0.1 ≤ x ≤ 0.5, LSMO becomes a ferromagnetic metal. Near x ≈ 0.3, the material exhibits its highest conductivity, a Curie temperature around 350–370 K, and nearly complete spin polarization, leading to its frequent description as a half-metal.

At higher Sr concentrations, competing magnetic interactions become increasingly important. Around x ≈ 0.5–0.7, ferromagnetic ordering remains strong, although the details of the magnetic structure and transport behavior depend sensitively on temperature, stoichiometry, and sample preparation.

As x approaches 1, the composition tends toward SrMnO_{3}, which is predominantly an antiferromagnetic insulator containing Mn^{4+} ions. Consequently, the ferromagnetic metallic state characteristic of intermediate doping levels disappears, illustrating the non-monotonic evolution of conductivity and magnetism across the phase diagram.

LSMO also exhibits a doping-dependent metal–insulator transition, paramagnetism, ferromagnetism, phase coexistence phenomena, and a reported Griffiths phase.

== Transport and spintronic properties ==
LSMO is a predominantly electronic conductor with an electronic transference number close to unity. It is among the perovskite manganites that exhibit colossal magnetoresistance (CMR), in which the electrical resistance changes dramatically in an applied magnetic field.

Near x ≈ 0.3, LSMO behaves as a half-metallic ferromagnet, meaning that charge transport at the Fermi level is dominated by a single spin channel. This property has made LSMO a model material for spintronics, magnetic tunnel junctions, and oxide heterostructures.

Above the Curie temperature, charge transport is often described in terms of Jahn–Teller polarons arising from strong electron–lattice coupling.

== Applications ==
LSMO is widely used as a cathode material in solid oxide fuel cells (SOFCs) because of its high electrical conductivity at elevated temperatures and its thermal expansion coefficient, which is well matched to that of yttria-stabilized zirconia (YSZ) electrolytes.

The material is also investigated for magnetic sensors, spin valves, magnetic tunnel junctions, and other spintronic devices that exploit its high spin polarization and relatively high Curie temperature.

== See also ==
- Solid oxide fuel cell
- Magnetic tunnel junction
- Colossal magnetoresistance
- Double-exchange mechanism
