= Colossal magnetoresistance =

Colossal magnetoresistance (CMR) is a property of some materials, mostly manganese-based perovskite oxides, that enables them to dramatically change their electrical resistance in the presence of a magnetic field. The magnetoresistance of conventional materials enables changes in resistance of up to 5%, but materials featuring CMR may demonstrate resistance changes by orders of magnitude.

This technology may find uses in disk read-and-write heads, allowing for increases in hard disk drive data density. However, so far it has not led to practical applications because it requires low temperatures and bulky equipment.

== History ==
Initially discovered in mixed-valence perovskite manganites in the 1950s by G. H. Jonker and J. H. van Santen, a first theoretical description in terms of the double-exchange mechanism was given early on. In this model, the spin orientation of adjacent Mn moments is associated with kinetic exchange of e_{g}-electrons. Consequently, alignment of the Mn spins by an external magnetic field causes higher conductivity. Relevant experimental work was done by Volger, Wollan and Koehler, and later on by Jirak et al. and Pollert et al.

However, the double exchange model did not adequately explain the high insulating-like resistivity above the transition temperature. In the 1990s, work by R. von Helmolt et al. and Jin et al. initiated a large number of further studies. Although there is still no complete understanding of the phenomenon, there is a variety of theoretical and experimental work providing a deeper understanding of the relevant effects.

== Theory ==
One prominent model is the so-called half-metallic ferromagnetic model, which is based on spin-polarized (SP) band structure calculations using the local spin-density approximation (LSDA) of the density functional theory (DFT) where separate calculations are carried out for spin-up and spin-down electrons. The half-metallic state is concurrent with the existence of a metallic majority spin band and a nonmetallic minority spin band in the ferromagnetic phase.

This model is not the same as the Stoner Model of itinerant ferromagnetism. In the Stoner model, a high density of states at the Fermi level makes the nonmagnetic state unstable. In SP calculations of covalent ferromagnets using DFT-LSDA functionals, the exchange-correlation integral takes the place of the Stoner parameter. The density of states at the Fermi level does not play a special role. A significant advantage of the half-metallic model is that it does not rely on the presence of mixed valency as does the double exchange mechanism and it can therefore explain the observation of CMR in stoichiometric phases like the pyrochlore Tl_{2}Mn_{2}O_{7}. Microstructural effects in polycrystalline samples have also been investigated and it has been found that the magnetoresistance is often dominated by the tunneling of spin-polarized electrons between grains, resulting in the magnetoresistance having an intrinsic dependence on grain size.

A fully quantitative understanding of the CMR effect remains elusive and it is still the subject of much current research. Early promises of the development of new CMR-based technologies have not yet come to fruition.

== See also ==
- Giant magnetoresistance
