= Anne Osbourn =

Professor of biology

Anne Osbourn FRS
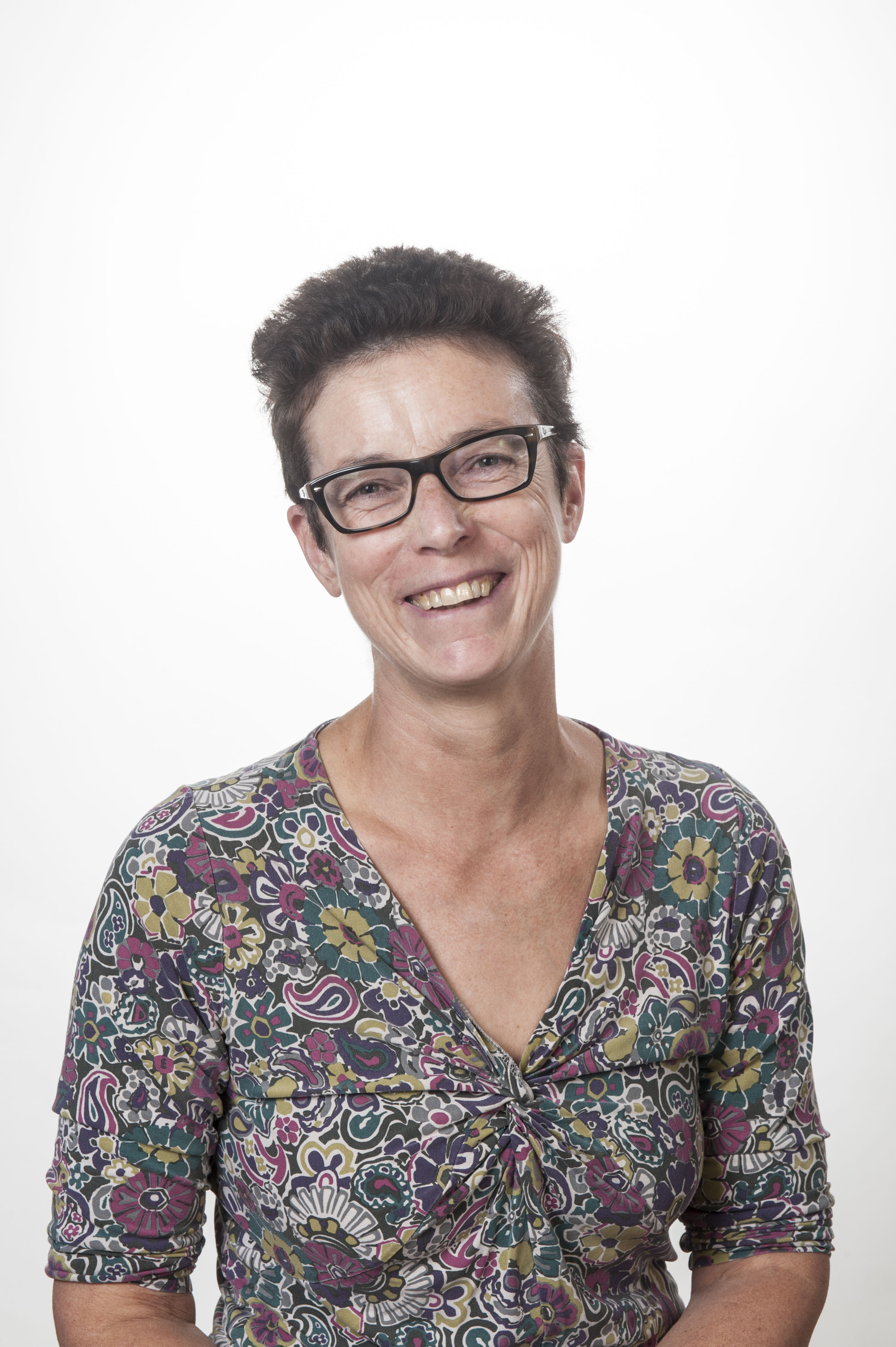
- Osbourn in 2015
- Born: Anne Elisabeth Osbourn
- Education: Bingley Grammar School
- Alma mater: Durham University; University of Birmingham
- Scientific career
- Fields: Natural products
- Institutions: John Innes Centre; University of East Anglia; Sainsbury Laboratory; New Phytologist
- Thesis: Host adaptation and variation in septoria nodorum (1985)
- Website: www.jic.ac.uk/people/anne-osbourn

Anne Elisabeth Osbourn is a professor of biology and group leader at the John Innes Centre, where she investigates plant natural product biosynthesis. She discovered that in the plant genome, the genes involved with biosynthesis organise in clusters. She is also a popular science communicator, poet and is the founder of the Science, Art and Writing (SAW) Initiative. She was elected a member of the National Academy of Sciences in 2022.

== Early life and education ==
Osbourn grew up in West Yorkshire. Her parents both studied and lectured English literature and her father served in the army during World War II. She became interested in plants as a child and she attended Bingley Grammar School graduating in 1979. She earned a bachelor's degree in botany at Durham University in 1982. At this time, researchers worked out how to transform the Rhizobium nitrogen fixation genes into the bacterium Escherichia coli. Osbourn moved to the University of Birmingham for her doctoral studies on host adaptation in Septoria nodorum, supervised by Chris Caten. She has described the Salem State University educationalist Louise Swiniarksi as her 'anchor throughout my adult life'.

== Research and career ==
Osbourn moved to Norwich in 1985 to work as a post-doctoral researcher at the John Innes Centre . In 1987 she joined The Sainsbury Laboratory as a Research Fellow, and she became a group leader in 1999. In 2005 she re-joined the John Innes Centre as a group leader, and was appointed head of the Department for Metabolic Biology in 2006.

Her early work looked at saponins and their role in plant defence. Osbourn studies how natural products interact with natural organisms. In particular, she has worked on the biosynthesis of triterpene. She identified that metabolic pathways organise in operon-like clusters, which allowed her to develop a novel opportunity to discover natural product pathways through genome mining. The natural products include terpenes, which can be used in the pharmaceutical industry as well as food and manufacturing.

Her research has been funded by the Biotechnology and Biological Sciences Research Council (BBSRC).

In 2006, Osbourn became an Honorary Professor at the University of East Anglia. Since 2014 she has been the director of the OpenPlant Synthetic Biology Research Centre, a BBSRC and EPSRC-funded Synthetic Biology Research Centre led jointly by the John Innes Centre and the University of Cambridge. The Cambridge-based Director is Professor Jim Haseloff and the formal lead is Professor Sir David Baulcombe.

She was the Director of the Norwich Research Park Industrial Biotechnology Alliance from 2013 to 2019.

As a group leader at the John Innes Centre she leads a research group working on plant natural products, their biosynthesis, function, mechanisms of metabolic diversification and metabolic engineering.

== Public engagement ==
In 2004, Osbourn was appointed to the UEA Creative Writing Course as a Nesta dreamtime fellow. Here she wrote poetry about her life as a plant scientist. Since then Osbourn has become a popular science writer, and inspired by her own creative practice she founded the Science, Art and Writing (SAW) Trust in 2005. The SAW Trust is an international charity that promotes innovation in science communication, and works with young people from elementary schools in initiatives which bring together scientists, writers and artists to explore creative science communication initiatives. The SAW Trust, working with educational bureaus and schools in China, has built an extensive educational programme for schools. Over 1,000 children have now taken part in SAW projects in schools in China.

In 2016 Osbourn took part in an international exchange with the Vietnam Academy of Science and Technology.

== Honours and Editorial positions ==
Osbourn was elected to AcademiaNet in 2014. She is an editor of the New Phytologist and is on the editorial board of Molecular Plant.

She has won various awards and honours, including the medal of the University of Helsinki in 2003. In 2018 she was elected a Fellow of the Linnean Society, and in 2019 Osbourn was elected as a Fellow of the Royal Society (FRS). She is the thirtieth research who has been elected Fellow from the John Innes Centre.

She was appointed Officer of the Order of the British Empire (OBE) in the 2020 New Year Honours for services to plant science.

== Patents ==
- 2011 Root-specific promoters
- 2008 Enzymes involved in triterpene synthesis
