= Erich Peter Wohlfarth =

German-English physicist (1924–1988)

- Born: 7 December 1924; Gleiwitz, German Reich
- Died: 16 March 1988 (aged 63); London, England
- Education: University of Leeds
- Known for: Stoner–Wohlfarth model
- Awards: Fellow of the Institute of Physics; Distinguished Lecturer of the IEEE Magnetics Society (1979); IEEE Centennial Medal (1984)
- Scientific career
- Fields: Theoretical solid state physics; Magnetism
- Doctoral advisor: Edmund Clifton Stoner

Erich Peter Wohlfarth (7 December 1924 in Gleiwitz, Upper Silesia – 16 March 1988, in London) was a theoretical physicist. He is known for his work in magnetism, in particular the Stoner–Wohlfarth model he developed together with his doctoral advisor and teacher, E.C. Stoner. The Institute of Physics' Magnetism Group's annual Wohlfarth Memorial Lecture is named after him.

Wohlfarth's family emigrated from Germany to England in 1933 to escape political persecution. He was educated at Bingley Grammar School and went on to study at the University of Leeds, earning a BSc in physics in 1946, and a PhD in 1948 for work conducted under the supervision of E. C. Stoner. He was later awarded the D.Sc. degree in 1957, again by the University of Leeds. In 1948 he moved to Imperial College London to become a lecturer in the Department of Mathematics. In 1964, he was promoted to the position of Professor of Theoretical Magnetism.

== See also ==
- Metamagnetism
