= Metamagnetism =

Sudden increase in magnetization

Metamagnetism is a sudden (often, dramatic) increase in the magnetization of a material with a small change in an externally applied magnetic field. The metamagnetic behavior may have quite different physical causes for different types of metamagnets. Some examples of physical mechanisms leading to metamagnetic behavior are:

1. Itinerant metamagnetism - Exchange splitting of the Fermi surface in a paramagnetic system of itinerant electrons causes an energetically favorable transition to bulk magnetization near the transition to a ferromagnet or other magnetically ordered state.
2. Antiferromagnetic transition - Field-induced spin flips in antiferromagnets cascade at a critical energy determined by the applied magnetic field.

Depending on the material and experimental conditions, metamagnetism may be associated with a first-order phase transition, a continuous phase transition at a critical point (classical or quantum), or crossovers beyond a critical point that do not involve a phase transition at all. These wildly different physical explanations sometimes lead to confusion as to what the term "metamagnetic" is referring in specific cases.
