= Stoner criterion =

Condition for ferromagnetism

The Stoner criterion is a condition to be fulfilled for the ferromagnetic order to arise in a simplified model of a solid. It is named after Edmund Clifton Stoner, who was the first to propose the mechanism.

== Stoner model of ferromagnetism ==
A schematic band structure for the Stoner model of ferromagnetism. An exchange interaction has split the energy of states with different spins, and states near the Fermi energy E_{F} are spin-polarized.

Ferromagnetism ultimately stems from Pauli exclusion. The simplified model of a solid which is nowadays usually called the Stoner model, can be formulated in terms of dispersion relations for spin up and spin down electrons,

$$E_\uparrow(k)=\epsilon(k)-I\frac{N_\uparrow-N_\downarrow}{N},\qquad
E_\downarrow(k)=\epsilon(k)+I\frac{N_\uparrow-N_\downarrow}{N},$$

where the second term accounts for the exchange energy, $I$ is the Stoner parameter, $N_\uparrow/N$ ($N_\downarrow/N$) is the dimensionless density (Note: Having a lattice model in mind, $N$ is the number of lattice sites and $N_\uparrow$ is the number of spin-up electrons in the whole system. The density of states has the units of inverse energy. On a finite lattice, $\epsilon(k)$ is replaced by discrete levels $\epsilon_i$ and then $D(E)=\sum_i \delta(E-\epsilon_i)$.) of spin up (down) electrons and $\epsilon(k)$ is the dispersion relation of spinless electrons where the electron-electron interaction is disregarded. If $N_\uparrow +N_\downarrow$ is fixed, $E_\uparrow(k), E_\downarrow(k)$ can be used to calculate the total energy of the system as a function of its polarization $P=(N_\uparrow-N_\downarrow)/N$. If the lowest total energy is found for $P=0$, the system prefers to remain paramagnetic but for larger values of $I$, polarized ground states occur. It can be shown that for

$$ID(E_{\rm F}) > 1$$

the $P=0$ state will spontaneously pass into a polarized one. This is the Stoner criterion, expressed in terms of the $P=0$ density of states at the Fermi energy $D(E_{\rm F})$.

A non-zero $P$ state may be favoured over $P=0$ even before the Stoner criterion is fulfilled.

== Relationship to the Heisenberg model and contemporary electronic structure theory ==
The Stoner model and the Heisenberg model are differing theories that can be thought of as describing two limiting cases of semiclassical magnetic ordering, particularly in the context of metallic systems.

In a Stoner-like picture, magnetic moments remain mutually aligned along some global axis of quantisation. With increasing temperature, the Fermi–Dirac distribution becomes broader, electron-hole excitations gradually overcome the propensity for exchange splitting, and magnetic moments smoothly collapse to zero. In this picture, the paramagnetic state is non-magnetic.

By contrast, in a Heisenberg-like picture, the magnitude of magnetic moments remain fixed, but the magnetic moment orientations deviate from perfect alignment with increasing temperature. In this picture, while the magnetic long-range order parameter is zero above the magnetic critical temperature, local magnetic moments around atoms persist.

The validity of these two competing models can be put on a self-consistent footing through application of the disordered local moment (DLM) picture in the context of ab initio electronic structure calculations. Typically it is found that, in metallic systems, systems are neither purely Heisenberg-like or purely Stoner-like.

== Relationship to the Hubbard model ==
The Stoner model can be obtained from the Hubbard model by applying the mean-field approximation. The particle density operators are written as their mean value $\langle n_i\rangle$ plus fluctuation $n_i-\langle n_i\rangle$ and the product of spin-up and spin-down fluctuations is neglected. We obtain

$$H = U \sum_i [n_{i,\uparrow} \langle n_{i,\downarrow}\rangle
+n_{i,\downarrow} \langle n_{i,\uparrow}\rangle
- \langle n_{i,\uparrow}\rangle \langle n_{i,\downarrow}\rangle] - t
\sum_{\langle i,j\rangle,\sigma} (c^{\dagger}_{i,\sigma}c_{j,\sigma}+h.c).$$

With the third term included, which was omitted in the definition above, we arrive at the better-known form of the Stoner criterion

$$D(E_{\rm F})U > 1.$$
