= Wohlfarth Lectureship =

The Wohlfarth Memorial Lecture, and the Wohlfarth Lectureship, is a lecture and prize given at the UK-based Institute of Physics' annual Magnetism Conference. It is named after Professor Erich Peter Wohlfarth, in honour of his "outstanding contribution [...] to the field of magnetism". It has been awarded since 1989.

== Recipients ==
Year	Name	Institution	Lecture Title	Conference	Location
2024	Karin Everschor-Sitte	University of Duisburg-Essen	"Let’s TWIST Again: Topological Whirls In SpinTronics"	Magnetism 2024	Loughborough
2023	Chiara Ciccarelli	University of Cambridge	"Extracting spin from an antiferromagnet at picosecond timescales"	Magnetism 2023	Manchester
2022	Peter Wadley	University of Nottingham	"Controlling and utilising antiferromagnetic order"	Magnetism 2022	York
2021	Volodymyr Kruglyak	University of Exeter	"Magnonics: Of Spins and Waves"	Magnetism 2021	Virtual
2020	Aurelien Manchon	Aix-Marseille Université, CNRS, CINaM	"Spin-orbit physics at magnetic interfaces"	Magnetism 2020	Virtual
2019	Julie Grollier	CRNS/Thales France	"Neuromorphic computing with spintronic nano-oscillators"	Magnetism 2019	Leeds
2018	Gino Hrkac	University of Exeter	"ATOMs - Atomistic to Micromagnetic modelling: from permanent magnets to magnetic hybrid materials"	Magnetism 2018	Manchester
2017	Andre Thiaville	University of Paris-Sud	"New Magnetic Materials Exploiting Chiral Interactions"	Magnetism 2017	York
2016	Jöerg Wunderlich	Hitachi Cambridge Laboratory	"Antiferromagnetic spintronics: Large magnitude magneto-resistance effects and current controlled switching"	Magnetism 2016	Sheffield
2015	Laura Heyderman	ETH Zurich/Paul Scherrer Institute	"Shedding light on artificial ferroic systems"	Magnetism 2015	Leeds
2014	Atsufumi Hirohata	University of York	"Nano-Spintronic Devices"	Magnetism 2014	Manchester
2012	Steven Bramwell	University College London			
2011	Christopher Marrows	University of Leeds			
2010	Guido Meier	University of Hamburg			
2009	Stephen Blundell	University of Oxford			
2008	Matthias Bode	University of Hamburg/Argonne National Laboratory			
2007	Caroline Ross	Massachusetts Institute of Technology			
2006	Stuart Parkin	IBM			
2005	Thomas Schrefl	University of Sheffield			
2004	Bob Stamps	University of Western Australia			
2003	Amanda Petford-Long	University of Oxford			
2002	Wolfgang Wernsdorfer	Lab Louis Néel, Grenoble			
2000	Russell Cowburn	Durham University			
1999	Tony Bland	University of Cambridge			
1998	Stephen Hayden	University of Bristol			
1997	Mary Doerner	IBM Almaden			
1996	David Awschalom	University of California, Santa Barbara			
1995	Dominique Givord	Lab Louis Néel, Grenoble			
1994	Roy Chantrell	Bangor University			
1993	Peter Grünberg	Forschungszentrum Jülich			
1992	Rolf Allenspach	IBM Research – Zurich			
1990	R. Coehoorn	Philips Research Labs, Eindhoven			
1989	Piers Coleman	Rutgers University			

== See also ==
- Institute of Physics
- Institute of Physics Awards
