= Manganese arsenide =

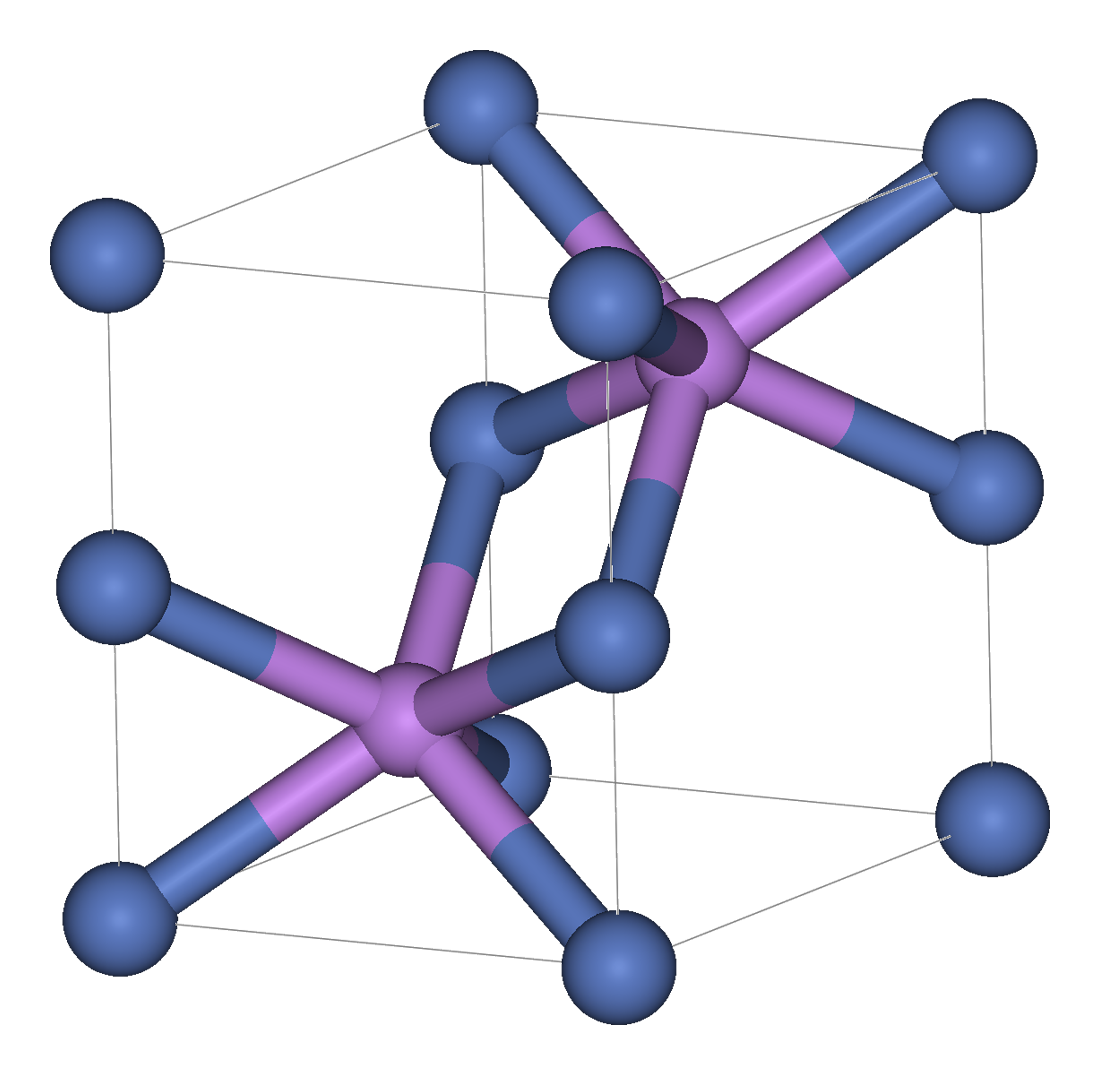

Names
- IUPAC name Manganese arsenide

Identifiers
CAS Number	12005-95-7
3D model (JSmol)	Interactive image
ChemSpider	74705
ECHA InfoCard	100.031.331
EC Number	234-478-9
PubChem CID	82783
CompTox Dashboard (EPA)	DTXSID001312125
- InChI: InChI=1S/Mn.As Key: NYOGMBUMDPBEJK-UHFFFAOYSA-N
- SMILES: [As].[Mn]

Properties
Chemical formula	MnAs
Molar mass	129.859 g/mol

Structure
Crystal structure	Hexagonal (NiAs)
Space group	P6_{3}/mmc (No. 194), hP4
Lattice constant	a = 0.4 nm, c = 0.5702 nm
Formula units (Z)	2

Hazards
Flash point	Non-flammable

Related compounds
Other anions	Manganese silicide
Other cations	Gallium arsenide Nickel arsenide
Related compounds	Gallium manganese arsenide
- Except where otherwise noted, data are given for materials in their standard state (at 25 °C [77 °F], 100 kPa). (what is ?) Infobox references

Manganese arsenide (MnAs) is an intermetallic compound, an arsenide of manganese. It forms ferromagnetic crystals with hexagonal (NiAs-type) crystal structure, which convert to the paramagnetic orthorhombic β-phase upon heating to 45 °C (113 °F). MnAs has potential applications in spintronics, for electrical spin injection into GaAs and Si based devices.
