= Exchange interaction =

Quantum mechanical effect

In chemistry and physics, the exchange interaction is a quantum mechanical constraint on the states of indistinguishable particles. While sometimes called an exchange force, or, in the case of fermions, Pauli repulsion, its consequences cannot always be predicted based on classical ideas of force. Both bosons and fermions can experience the exchange interaction.

The wave function of indistinguishable particles is subject to exchange symmetry: the wave function either changes sign (for fermions) or remains unchanged (for bosons) when two particles are exchanged. The exchange symmetry alters the expectation value of the distance between two indistinguishable particles when their wave functions overlap. For fermions the expectation value of the distance increases, and for bosons it decreases (compared to distinguishable particles).

The exchange interaction arises from the combination of exchange symmetry and the Coulomb interaction. For an electron in an electron gas, the exchange symmetry creates an "exchange hole" in its vicinity, which other electrons with the same spin tend to avoid due to the Pauli exclusion principle. This decreases the energy associated with the Coulomb interactions between the electrons with same spin. Since two electrons with different spins are distinguishable from each other and not subject to the exchange symmetry, the effect tends to align the spins. The exchange interaction is the main physical effect responsible for ferromagnetism, and has no classical analogue.

For bosons, the exchange symmetry makes them bunch together, and the exchange interaction takes the form of an effective attraction that causes identical particles to be found closer together, as in Bose–Einstein condensation.

Exchange interaction effects were discovered independently by physicists Werner Heisenberg and Paul Dirac in 1926.

== Exchange properties ==
Quantum particles are fundamentally indistinguishable. Wolfgang Pauli demonstrated that this is a type of symmetry: states of two particles must either commute or anticommute when coordinate labels are exchanged. In a simple one-dimensional system with two identical particles in two states $\psi_a$ and $\psi_b$ the system wavefunction can therefore be written two ways:
$$\psi_a(x_1)\psi_b(x_2) \pm \psi_a(x_2)\psi_b(x_1).$$
Exchanging $x_1$ and $x_2$ gives either a commutative sum of the states ("plus") or the anticommutative difference ("minus"). Particles that correspond to commutative states are called bosons; those with anticommutative states are called fermions.

The two properties imply different physics. For example, the expectation value of the square of the distance between the two particles is
$$\langle (x_1-x_2)^2 \rangle_\pm = \langle x^2 \rangle_a + \langle x^2 \rangle_b - 2\langle x \rangle_a\langle x \rangle_b \mp 2\big|\langle x \rangle_{ab}\big|^2.$$
The last term reduces the expected value for bosons and increases the value for fermions but only when the states $\psi_a$ and $\psi_b$ physically overlap ($\langle x \rangle_{ab} \ne 0$).

The physical effect of the exchange property requirement is not a force. Rather it is a significant geometrical constraint, increasing the curvature of wavefunctions to prevent the overlap of the states occupied by indistinguishable fermions. The terms "exchange force" and "Pauli repulsion" for fermions are sometimes used as an intuitive description of the effect but this intuition can give incorrect physical results.

== Exchange interactions between localized electron magnetic moments ==
Quantum mechanical particles are classified as bosons or fermions. The spin–statistics theorem of quantum field theory demands that all particles with half-integer spin behave as fermions and all particles with integer spin behave as bosons. Multiple bosons may occupy the same quantum state; however, by the Pauli exclusion principle, no two fermions can occupy the same state. Since electrons have spin 1/2, they are fermions. This means that the overall wave function of a system must be antisymmetric when two electrons are exchanged, i.e. interchanged with respect to both spatial and spin coordinates. First, however, exchange will be explained with the neglect of spin.

=== Exchange of spatial coordinates ===
Taking a hydrogen molecule-like system (i.e. one with two electrons), one may attempt to model the state of each electron by first assuming the electrons behave independently (that is, as if the Pauli exclusion principle did not apply), and taking wave functions in position space of $\Phi_a(r_1)$ for the first electron and $\Phi_b(r_2)$ for the second electron. The functions $\Phi_a$ and $\Phi_b$ are orthogonal, and each corresponds to an energy eigenstate. To enforce the indistinguishability of the two electrons, two wave functions for the overall system in position space can be constructed. One uses an antisymmetric combination of the product wave functions in position space:

$$\Psi_{\rm A}(\vec r_1,\vec r_2)= \frac{1}{\sqrt{2}}[\Phi_a(\vec r_1) \Phi_b(\vec r_2) - \Phi_b(\vec r_1) \Phi_a(\vec r_2)]$$	1

The other uses a symmetric combination of the product wave functions in position space:

$$\Psi_{\rm S}(\vec r_1,\vec r_2)= \frac{1}{\sqrt{2}}[\Phi_a(\vec r_1) \Phi_b(\vec r_2) + \Phi_b(\vec r_1) \Phi_a(\vec r_2)]$$	2

To treat the problem of the hydrogen molecule perturbatively, the overall Hamiltonian is decomposed into an unperturbed Hamiltonian of the non-interacting hydrogen atoms $\mathcal{H}^{(0)}$ and a perturbing Hamiltonian, which accounts for interactions between the two atoms $\mathcal{H}^{(1)}$. The full Hamiltonian is then:

$$\mathcal{H} = \mathcal{H}^{(0)} + \mathcal{H}^{(1)}$$

where $\mathcal{H}^{(0)} = -\frac{\hbar^2}{2m}\nabla^{2}_{1}-\frac{\hbar^2}{2m}\nabla^{2}_{2}-\frac{e^2}{r_{a1}}-\frac{e^2}{r_{b2}}$ and $\mathcal{H}^{(1)} = \left(\frac {e^2}{R_{ab}} + \frac {e^2}{r_{12}} - \frac {e^2}{r_{a2}} - \frac {e^2}{r_{b1}}\right)$

The first two terms of $\mathcal{H}^{(0)}$ denote the kinetic energy of the electrons. The remaining terms account for attraction between the electrons and their host protons ($r_{a1/b2}$). The terms in $\mathcal{H}^{(1)}$ account for the potential energy corresponding to: proton–proton repulsion ($R_{ab}$), electron–electron repulsion ($r_{12}$), and electron–proton attraction between the electron of one host atom and the proton of the other ($r_{a2/b1}$). All quantities are assumed to be real.

Two eigenvalues for the system energy are found:

$$\ E_{\pm} = E_{(0)} + \frac{C \pm J_{\rm ex}}{1 \pm \mathcal{S}^2}$$	3

where the $E_+$ is the spatially symmetric solution and $E_-$ is the spatially antisymmetric solution, corresponding to $\Psi_{\rm S}$ and $\Psi_{\rm A}$ respectively. A variational calculation yields similar results. $\mathcal{H}$ can be diagonalized by using the position–space functions given by Eqs. (1) and (2). In Eq. (3), $C$ is the two-site two-electron Coulomb integral (It may be interpreted as the repulsive potential for electron-one at a particular point $\Phi_a(\vec r_1)^2$ in an electric field created by electron-two distributed over the space with the probability density $\Phi_b(\vec r_2)^2)$, $\mathcal{S}$ (Note: Not to be confused with the total spin, $S$.) is the overlap integral, and $J_\mathrm{ex}$ is the exchange integral, which is similar to the two-site Coulomb integral but includes exchange of the two electrons. It has no simple physical interpretation, but it can be shown to arise entirely due to the anti-symmetry requirement. These integrals are given by:

$$C = \int \Phi_a(\vec r_1)^2 \left(\frac{1}{R_{ab}} + \frac{1}{r_{12}} - \frac{1}{r_{a1}} - \frac{1}{r_{b2}}\right) \Phi_b(\vec r_2)^2 \, d^3r_1\, d^3r_2$$	4

$$\mathcal{S} = \int \Phi_b(\vec r_2) \Phi_a(\vec r_2) \, d^3r_2$$	5

$$J_{\rm ex} = \int \Phi_a^{*}(\vec r_1) \Phi_b^{*}(\vec r_2) \left(\frac{1}{R_{ab}} + \frac{1}{r_{12}} - \frac{1}{r_{a1}} - \frac{1}{r_{b2}}\right) \Phi_b(\vec r_1) \Phi_a(\vec r_2) \, d^3r_1\, d^3r_2$$	6

Although in the hydrogen molecule the exchange integral, Eq. (6), is negative, Heisenberg first suggested that it changes sign at some critical ratio of internuclear distance to mean radial extension of the atomic orbital. The detailed calculation, including evaluation of the above integrals with ground state hydrogen atom wave functions, and application of the variational principle to obtain the minimum energy in both cases of the hydrogen molecule for atomic orbitals and the hydrogen radical (i.e. with only one electron) for molecular orbitals can be found in the book of Müller-Kirsten pp. 272-292 (only in the second edition).

=== Inclusion of spin ===
The symmetric and antisymmetric combinations in Equations (1) and (2) did not include the spin variables (α = spin-up; β = spin-down); there are also antisymmetric and symmetric combinations of the spin variables:

$$\alpha(1) \beta(2) \pm \alpha(2) \beta(1)$$	7

To obtain the overall wave function, these spin combinations have to be coupled with Eqs. (1) and (2). The resulting overall wave functions, called spin-orbitals, are written as Slater determinants. When the orbital wave function is symmetrical, the spin wave function must be anti-symmetrical and vice versa. Accordingly, $E_+$ above corresponds to the spatially symmetric/spin-singlet solution and $E_-$ to the spatially antisymmetric/spin-triplet solution.

J. H. Van Vleck presented the following analysis:

The potential energy of the interaction between the two electrons in orthogonal orbitals can be represented by a matrix, say $E_\textrm{ex}$. From Eq. (3), the characteristic values of this matrix are $C \pm J_\textrm{ex}$. The characteristic values of a matrix are its diagonal elements after it is converted to a diagonal matrix (that is, eigenvalues). Now, the characteristic values of the square of the magnitude of the resultant spin, $\langle (\vec{s}_a + \vec{s}_b)^2 \rangle$ is $S(S+1)$. The characteristic values of the matrices $\langle \vec{s}_a^{\;2}\rangle$ and $\langle \vec{s}_b^{\;2}\rangle$ are each $\tfrac{1}{2}(\tfrac{1}{2} + 1) = \tfrac{3}{4}$ and $\langle(\vec{s}_a + \vec{s}_b)^2\rangle = \langle\vec{s}_a^{\;2}\rangle + \langle\vec{s}_b^{\;2}\rangle + 2\langle\vec{s}_a \cdot \vec{s}_b\rangle$. The characteristic values of the scalar product $\langle\vec{s}_a \cdot \vec{s}_b\rangle$ are $\tfrac{1}{2}(0 - \tfrac{6}{4})= -\tfrac{3}{4}$ and $\tfrac{1}{2}(2 - \tfrac{6}{4}) = \tfrac{1}{4}$, corresponding to both the spin-singlet ($S = 0$) and spin-triplet ($S = 1$) states, respectively.

From Eq. (3) and the aforementioned relations, the matrix $E_\textrm{ex}$ is seen to have the characteristic value $C + J_\textrm{ex}$ when $\langle\vec{s}_a \cdot \vec{s}_b\rangle$ has the characteristic value −3/4 (i.e. when $S = 0$; the spatially symmetric/spin-singlet state). Alternatively, it has the characteristic value $C - J_\textrm{ex}$ when $\langle \vec{s}_a \cdot \vec{s}_b\rangle$ has the characteristic value +1/4 (i.e. when $S = 1$; the spatially antisymmetric/spin-triplet state). Therefore,

$$E_{\rm ex} - C + \frac{1}{2}J_{\rm ex} + 2J_{\rm ex} \langle\vec{s}_a \cdot \vec{s}_b\rangle = 0$$	8

and, hence,

$$E_{\rm ex} = C - \frac{1}{2}J_{\rm ex} - 2J_{\rm ex} \langle\vec{s}_a \cdot \vec{s}_b\rangle$$	9

where the spin momenta are given as $\langle\vec{s}_a\rangle$ and $\langle\vec{s}_b\rangle$.

Dirac pointed out that the critical features of the exchange interaction could be obtained in an elementary way by neglecting the first two terms on the right-hand side of Eq. (9), thereby considering the two electrons as simply having their spins coupled by a potential of the form:

$\ -2J_{ab} \langle\vec{s}_a \cdot \vec{s}_b\rangle$	10

It follows that the exchange interaction Hamiltonian between two electrons in orbitals $\Phi_a$ and $\Phi_b$ can be written in terms of their spin momenta $\vec{s}_a$ and $\vec{s}_b$. This interaction is named the Heisenberg exchange Hamiltonian or the Heisenberg–Dirac Hamiltonian in the older literature:

$\mathcal{H}_{\rm Heis} = -2J_{ab} \langle\vec{s}_a \cdot \vec{s}_b\rangle$	11

$J_\textrm{ab}$ is not the same as the quantity labeled $J_\textrm{ex}$ in Eq. (6). Rather, $J_\textrm{ab}$, which is termed the exchange constant, is a function of Eqs. (4), (5), and (6), namely,

$\ J_{ab} = \frac{1}{2} (E_+ - E_-) = \frac{J_{\rm ex}- C\mathcal{S}^2}{1-\mathcal{S}^4}$	12

However, with orthogonal orbitals (in which $\mathcal{S}$ = 0), for example with different orbitals in the same atom, $J_\textrm{ab} = J_\textrm{ex}$.

=== Effects of exchange ===
If $J_\textrm{ab}$ is positive the exchange energy favors electrons with parallel spins; this is a primary cause of ferromagnetism in materials in which the electrons are considered localized in the Heitler–London model of chemical bonding, but this model of ferromagnetism has severe limitations in solids (see below). If $J_\textrm{ab}$ is negative, the interaction favors electrons with antiparallel spins, potentially causing antiferromagnetism. The sign of $J_\textrm{ab}$ is essentially determined by the relative sizes of $J_\textrm{ex}$ and the product of $C \mathcal{S}$. This sign can be deduced from the expression for the difference between the energies of the triplet and singlet states, $E_- - E_+$:

$\ E_{-} - E_{+} = \frac{2(C\mathcal{S}^2 - J_{\rm ex})}{1-\mathcal{S}^4}$	13

Although these consequences of the exchange interaction are magnetic in nature, the cause is not; it is due primarily to electric repulsion and the Pauli exclusion principle. In general, the direct magnetic interaction between a pair of electrons (due to their electron magnetic moments) is negligibly small compared to this electric interaction.

Exchange energy splittings are very elusive to calculate for molecular systems at large internuclear distances. However, analytical formulae have been worked out for the hydrogen molecular ion (see references herein).

Normally, exchange interactions are very short-ranged, confined to electrons in orbitals on the same atom (intra-atomic exchange) or nearest neighbor atoms (direct exchange) but longer-ranged interactions can occur via intermediary atoms and this is termed superexchange.

== Direct exchange interactions in solids ==
In a crystal, generalization of the Heisenberg Hamiltonian in which the sum is taken over the exchange Hamiltonians for all the $(i,j)$ pairs of atoms of the many-electron system gives:.

$$\mathcal{H}_{\text{Heis}} = \frac{1}{2}\left(-2J\sum_{i,j} \langle\vec{S}_i \cdot \vec{S}_j\rangle\right) = -\sum_{i,j}J \langle\vec{S}_i \cdot \vec{S}_j \rangle$$	14

The 1/2 factor is introduced because the interaction between the same two atoms is counted twice in performing the sums. Note that the $J$ in Eq.(14) is the exchange constant $J_\textrm{ab}$ above not the exchange integral $J_\textrm{ex}$. The exchange integral $J_\textrm{ex}$ is related to yet another quantity, called the exchange stiffness constant ($A$) which serves as a characteristic of a ferromagnetic material. The relationship is dependent on the crystal structure. For a simple cubic lattice with lattice parameter $a$,

$$A_{sc} = \frac{J_\text{ex}\langle S^2\rangle}{a}$$	15

For a body-centered cubic lattice,

$$A_{bcc} = \frac{2J_\text{ex}\langle S^2\rangle}{a}$$	16

and for a face-centered cubic lattice,

$$A_{fcc} = \frac{4J_\text{ex}\langle S^2\rangle}{a}$$	17

The form of Eq. (14) corresponds identically to the Ising model of ferromagnetism except that in the Ising model, the dot product of the two spin angular momenta is replaced by the scalar product $S_{ij}S_{ji}$. The Ising model was invented by Wilhelm Lenz in 1920 and solved for the one-dimensional case by his doctoral student Ernst Ising in 1925. The energy of the Ising model is defined to be:

$$E = - \sum_{i\neq j} J_{ij} \langle S_{i}^z S_{j}^z\rangle \,$$	18

=== Limitations of the Heisenberg Hamiltonian and the localized electron model in solids ===
Because the Heisenberg Hamiltonian presumes the electrons involved in the exchange coupling are localized in the context of the Heitler–London, or valence bond (VB), theory of chemical bonding, it is an adequate model for explaining the magnetic properties of electrically insulating narrow-band ionic and covalent non-molecular solids where this picture of the bonding is reasonable. Nevertheless, theoretical evaluations of the exchange integral for non-molecular solids that display metallic conductivity in which the electrons responsible for the ferromagnetism are itinerant (e.g. iron, nickel, and cobalt) have historically been either of the wrong sign or much too small in magnitude to account for the experimentally determined exchange constant (e.g. as estimated from the Curie temperatures via $T_C \approx 2\langle J\rangle/3k_\textrm{B}$ where $\langle J\rangle$ is the exchange interaction averaged over all sites).

The Heisenberg model thus cannot explain the observed ferromagnetism in these materials. In these cases, a delocalized, or Hund–Mulliken–Bloch (molecular orbital/band) description, for the electron wave functions is more realistic. Accordingly, the Stoner model of ferromagnetism is more applicable.

In the Stoner model, the spin-only magnetic moment (in Bohr magnetons) per atom in a ferromagnet is given by the difference between the number of electrons per atom in the majority spin and minority spin states. The Stoner model thus permits non-integral values for the spin-only magnetic moment per atom. However, with ferromagnets $\mu_S = - g \mu_{\rm B} [S(S+1)]^{1/2}$ ($g$ = 2.0023 ≈ 2) tends to overestimate the total spin-only magnetic moment per atom.

For example, a net magnetic moment of 0.54 μ_{B} per atom for Nickel metal is predicted by the Stoner model, which is very close to the 0.61 Bohr magnetons calculated based on the metal's observed saturation magnetic induction, its density, and its atomic weight. By contrast, an isolated Ni atom (electron configuration = 3d^{8}4s^{2}) in a cubic crystal field will have two unpaired electrons of the same spin (hence, $\vec{S} = 1$) and would thus be expected to have in the localized electron model a total spin magnetic moment of $\mu_S = 2.83 \mu_{\rm B}$ (but the measured spin-only magnetic moment along one axis, the physical observable, will be given by $\vec{\mu}_S = g \mu_{\rm B} \vec{S} = 2 \mu_{\rm B}$).

Generally, valence s and p electrons are best considered delocalized, while 4f electrons are localized and 5f and 3d/4d electrons are intermediate, depending on the particular internuclear distances. In the case of substances where both delocalized and localized electrons contribute to the magnetic properties (e.g. rare-earth systems), the Ruderman–Kittel–Kasuya–Yosida (RKKY) model is the currently accepted mechanism.

== See also ==
- Double-exchange mechanism – Magnetic exchange between ions in different oxidation states
- Slater determinant – Function that can be used to build the wave function of a multi-fermionic system
- Superexchange – Strong coupling between two cations through an intermediary anion
- Holstein–Herring method – Numeric method in quantum chemistry
- Spin-exchange
- Multipolar exchange interaction – Higher-order interactions of magnetic moments of chemicals
- Antisymmetric exchange – Contribution to magnetic exchange interaction
