= Harmonic tensors =

Mathematical objects more general than vectors

In this article spherical functions are replaced by polynomials that have been well known in electrostatics since the time of Maxwell and associated with multipole moments. In physics, dipole and quadrupole moments typically appear because fundamental concepts of physics are associated precisely with them. Dipole and quadrupole moments are:

$$\int x_i\rho (\mathbf{x})dV$$,

$$\int (3x_i x_k-\delta_{ik})\rho (\mathbf{x})dV$$,

where $\rho (\mathbf{x})$ is density of charges (or other quantity).

Octupole moment

$$\int 3(5x_i x_k x_l- x_l\delta_{ik}-x_k\delta_{il}-x_i\delta_{lk})\rho (\mathbf{x})dV$$

is used rather seldom. As a rule, high-rank moments are calculated with the help of spherical functions. Spherical functions are convenient in scattering problems. Polynomials are preferable in calculations with differential operators. Here, properties of tensors, including high-rank moments as well, are considered to repeat basically features of solid spherical functions but having their own specifics.

Using of invariant polynomial tensors in Cartesian coordinates, as shown in a number of recent studies, is preferable and simplifies the fundamental scheme of calculations . The spherical coordinates are not involved here. The rules for using harmonic symmetric tensors are demonstrated that directly follow from their properties. These rules are naturally reflected in the theory of special functions, but are not always obvious, even though the group properties are general . At any rate, let us recall the main property of harmonic tensors: the trace over any pair of indices vanishes . Here, those properties of tensors are selected that not only make analytic calculations more compact and reduce 'the number of factorials' but also allow correctly formulating some fundamental questions of the theoretical physics .

== General properties ==
Four properties of symmetric tensor $\mathbf{M}_{i...k}$ lead to the use of it in physics.

A. Tensor is homogeneous polynomial:

$$\mathbf{M}_{i...k}(k\mathbf{x})=k^l\mathbf{M}_{i...k}(\mathbf{x})$$,

where $l$ is the number of indices, i.e., tensor rank;

B. Tensor is symmetric with respect to indices;

C. Tensor is harmonic, i.e., it is a solution of the Laplace equation:

$$\Delta \mathbf{M}_{i...k}(\mathbf{ x })=0$$;

D. Trace over any two indices vanishes:

$$\mathbf{M}_{ii[...]}( \mathbf{x } )=0$$,

where symbol $[...]$ denotes remaining $(l-2)$ indices after equating $i=i$.

Components of tensor are solid spherical functions. Tensor can be divided by factor $r^l$ to acquire components in the form of spherical functions.

== Multipole tensors in electrostatics ==
The multipole potentials arise when the potential of a point charge is expanded in powers of coordinates $x_{oi }$ of the radius vector $\mathbf{r }_{o}$ ('Maxwell poles') . For potential

$$\frac{1 }{\left|\mathbf{r}-\mathbf{r}_{o }\right| }$$,

there is well known formula:

$$\frac{1 }{\left|\mathbf{r}-\mathbf{r}_{o }\right| }=
\sum_l(-1)^l\frac{(\mathbf{r}_0\nabla )^l }{ l!}\frac{ 1}{ r }=
\sum_l\frac { x_{0i }...x_{0k} }{l!r^{ 2l+1 }  } \mathbf{M}_{i...k }^{(l)} (\mathbf{r} ) =
\sum_l\frac{ \mathbf{r}_0^{\otimes l} \mathbf{M}^{(l)}_{[i]} }{l! r^{2l+1 } }$$,

where the following notation is used. For the $l$th tensor power of the radius vector

$$x_{0i}...x_ {0k}=\mathbf{r}_0^{\otimes l}$$,

and for a symmetric harmonic tensor of rank $l$,

$$\mathbf{M}^{( l ) }_{i...k }(\mathbf{r } )= \mathbf{M}^{( l ) }_{[i] }(\mathbf{r } )$$.

The tensor is a homogeneous harmonic polynomial with described the general properties. Contraction over any two indices (when the two gradients become the $\Delta$ operator) is null. If tensor is divided by $r^{2l+1 }$, then a multipole harmonic tensor arises

$$\frac{\mathbf{M}^{( l ) }_{i...k }(\mathbf{r })}{r^{2l+1 } } =\frac{ \mathbf{M}^{( l ) }_{[i] }(\mathbf{r }) }{r^{2l+1 } }$$,

which is also a homogeneous harmonic function with homogeneity degree $-(l+1)$.

From the formula for potential follows that

$$\frac{\mathbf{M}^{( l+1 ) }_{im...k }(\mathbf{r })}{r^{2l+3 } } = -\nabla _i \frac{\mathbf{M}^ {(l)} _{m...k }(\mathbf{r })}{r^{2l+1}}$$,

which allows to construct a ladder operator.

== Theorem on power-law equivalent moments in electrostatics ==
There is an obvious property of contraction

$$(2l-1)!! ( \mathbf{ r}_0^{\otimes l } ,\mathbf{M }^{( l )}_{[i] }(\mathbf{r })) =
( \mathbf{M }^{( l )}_{[i] }(\mathbf{r }_0) , \mathbf{M }^{( l )}_{[i] }(\mathbf{r } ) )$$,

that give rise to a theorem simplifying essentially the calculation of moments in theoretical physics.

Theorem

Let $\rho (x)$ be a distribution of charge. When calculating a multipole potential, power-law moments can be used instead of harmonic tensors (or instead of spherical functions ):

$$(\int\rho(\mathbf{r}_0 ) \mathbf{ r}_0^{\otimes l }dV_{\mathbf{r}_0 } ,\frac{\mathbf{M }^{( l )}_{[i] }(\mathbf{r })}{l!r^{ 2l+1} }) =
( \int \rho (\mathbf{r}_0 )\mathbf{M }^{( l )}_{[i] }(\mathbf{r }_0)dV_{\mathbf{r}_0 },\frac{ \mathbf{M }^{( l )}_{[i] }(\mathbf{r } )}{(2l-1)!!l!r^{2l+1} } )$$.

It is an advantage in comparing with using of spherical functions.

Example 1.

For the quadrupole moment, instead of the integral

$$\int \rho(\mathbf{r}) (3x_i x_k-r^2 \delta_{ik})dV$$,

one can use 'short' integral

$$3\int \rho(\mathbf{r}) x_i x_k dV$$.

Moments are different but potentials are equal each other.

== Formula for a harmonic tensor ==
Formula for the tensor was considered in using a ladder operator. It can be derived using the Laplace operator. Similar approach is known in the theory of special functions. The first term in the formula, as is easy to see from expansion of a point charge potential, is equal to

$$\mathbf{M}^ {(l ) }_{[i] } ( \mathbf{ r } ) = (2l-1)!!x_{i_1}...x_{i_l }+...=(2l-1)!!\mathbf{r}^{\otimes l }+...$$.

The remaining terms can be obtained by repeatedly applying the Laplace operator and multiplying by an even power of the modulus $r$. The coefficients are easy to determine by substituting expansion in the Laplace equation . As a result, formula is following:

$\mathbf{M}^ {(l ) }_{[i] } ( \mathbf{ r } ) = (2l-1)!!\mathbf{r}^ {\otimes l }- \frac{(2l-3)!!}{1!2^1 }r^2\Delta\mathbf{r}^ {\otimes l }+ \frac{(2l-5)!!}{2!2^2 }r^4\Delta^2\mathbf{r}^ {\otimes l }- \frac{(2l-7)!!}{3!2^3 }r^6\Delta^3\mathbf{r}^ {\otimes l }+...$

.

This form is useful for applying differential operators of quantum mechanics and electrostatics to it. The differentiation generates product of the Kronecker symbols.

Example 2

$$\Delta x_i x_k=2\delta_{ik }$$,
$$\Delta x_i x_k x_m=2(\delta_{ik }x_m+ \delta_{km}x_i+\delta_{im }x_k)$$,
$$\Delta\Delta x_i x_k x_m x_n =8(\delta_{ik }\delta_{mn }+ \delta_{km}\delta_{in }+\delta_{im }\delta_{kn })$$.

The last quality can be verified using the contraction with $i=k$ . It is convenient to write the differentiation formula in terms of the symmetrization operation. A symbol for it was proposed in, with the help of sum taken over all independent permutations of indices:

$$\frac{\Delta^k\mathbf{r}^{\otimes l }}{k!2^k }=\left\langle \left\langle \delta_{[..]}^{\otimes (l-2k)} \mathbf{ r}^{\otimes (l-2k) } \right\rangle \right\rangle$$.

As a result, the following formula is obtained:

$\mathbf{M}^{(l)}_{ [i]}(\mathbf{r})= (2l-1)!!\mathbf{ r}^{\otimes l}- (2l-3)!!r^2 \left\langle \left\langle \delta_{[..]}^{\otimes 1} \mathbf{ r}^{\otimes (l-2) } \right\rangle \right\rangle + (2l-5)!!r^4\left\langle \left\langle \delta_{[..]}^{\otimes 2} \mathbf{ r}^{\otimes (l-4) } \right\rangle \right\rangle-...$

,

where the symbol $\otimes k$ is used for a tensor power of the Kronecker symbol $\delta_{im}$ and conventional symbol [..] is used for the two subscripts that are being changed under symmetrization.

Following one can find the relation between the tensor and solid spherical functions. Two unit vectors are needed: vector $\mathbf{ n}_z$ directed along the $z$-axis and complex vector $\mathbf{ n}_x \pm i\mathbf{n}_y=\mathbf{n}_{\pm}$. Contraction with their powers gives the required relation

$$(\mathbf{M}^{(l)}_{ [i]} (\mathbf{r}),\mathbf{n}^{\otimes (l-m)}_z \mathbf{n}^{\otimes m}_{\pm } ) = (l-m)!(x+iy)^m r^{(l-m)}\frac{d^m }{dt^m}P_l(t) \mid_{t=\frac{z }{ r }}$$,

where $P_l(t)$ is a Legendre polynomial .

== Special contractions ==
In perturbation theory, it is necessary to expand the source in terms of spherical functions. If the source is a polynomial, for example, when calculating the Stark effect, then the integrals are standard, but cumbersome. When calculating with the help of invariant tensors, the expansion coefficients are simplified, and there is then no need to integrals. It suffices, as shown in, to calculate contractions that lower the rank of the tensors under consideration. Instead of integrals, the operation of calculating the trace $\hat{ T }r$ of a tensor over two indices is used. The following rank reduction formula is useful:

$$\hat{T}r \left\langle\left\langle \delta_{ik} \mathbf{M }^{(l)}_{ik[m] } \right\rangle\right\rangle = (2l+3)\mathbf{M}^{(l-2)}_{[m]}$$,

where symbol [m] denotes all left (l-2) indices.

If the brackets contain several factors with the Kronecker delta, the following relation formula holds:

$$\hat{T}r \left\langle\left\langle \delta_{i_1 p_1}...\delta_{i_k p_k } \mathbf{M }^{(l)}_{i_1p_1[m] } \right\rangle\right\rangle = (2l+2k+1)\left\langle\left\langle \delta_{i_2 p_2 }...\delta_{i_kp_k } \mathbf{M}^{(l-2)}_{[m]}\right\rangle\right\rangle$$.

Calculating the trace reduces the number of the Kronecker symbols by one, and the rank of the harmonic tensor on the right-hand side of the equation decreases by two. Repeating the calculation of the trace k times eliminates all the Kronecker symbols:

$$\hat{T}r_1...\hat{T}r_k \left\langle\left\langle \delta_{i_1 p_1}...\delta_{i_k p_k } \mathbf{M }^{(l)}_{[m] } \right\rangle\right\rangle = (2l+2k+1)!!\left\langle\left\langle \mathbf{M}^{(l-2k)}_{[m]}\right\rangle\right\rangle$$.

== Harmonic 4D tensors ==
The Laplace equation in four-dimensional 4D space has its own specifics. The potential of a point charge in 4D space is equal to $\frac{ 1 } { r^2}$ . From the expansion of the point-charge potential $\frac{ 1 } { {(\mathbf {r}-\mathbf{r}_0)}^2}$ with respect to powers $\mathbf{r}_0^{\otimes n }$ the multipole 4D potential arises:

$$\frac{\mathfrak{ M}^{(n)}_{i...k } }{ r^{ 2n+2} } = { (-1) }^n \nabla_i...\nabla_k\frac{1}{ r^2}$$.

The harmonic tensor in the numerator has a structure similar to 3D harmonic tensor. Its contraction with respect to any two indices must vanish. The dipole and quadruple 4-D tensors, as follows from here, are expressed as

$$\mathfrak{ M}^{(1)}_{i }(\mathbf{r } ) = 2x_i$$,
$$\mathfrak{ M}^{(2)}_{ik }(\mathbf{r } ) = 2(4x_i x_k-\delta_{ ik })$$,

The leading term of the expansion, as can be seen, is equal to

$$\mathfrak{ M}^{(n)}_{[i] }(\mathbf{r } ) =(2n)!!x_{ i_1 } ...x_ {i_n } -...=(2n)!!\mathbf{ r}^{\otimes n }-...$$

The method described for 3D tensor, gives relations

$\mathfrak{M}^ {(n ) }_{[i] } ( \mathbf{ r } ) = (2n)!!\mathbf{r}^ {\otimes n }- \frac{(2n-2)!!}{1!2^1 }r^2\Delta\mathbf{r}^ {\otimes n }+ \frac{(2n-4)!!}{2!2^2 }r^4\Delta^2\mathbf{r}^ {\otimes n }- \frac{(2n-6)!!}{3!2^3 }r^6\Delta^3\mathbf{r}^ {\otimes n }+...$

,

$\mathfrak{M}^{(l)}_{ [i]}(\mathbf{r})= (2n)!!\mathbf{ r}^{\otimes n}- (2n-2)!!r^2 \left\langle \left\langle \delta_{[..]}^{\otimes 1} \mathbf{ r}^{\otimes (n-2) } \right\rangle \right\rangle + (2n-4)!!r^4\left\langle \left\langle \delta_{[..]}^{\otimes 2} \mathbf{ r}^{\otimes (n-4) } \right\rangle \right\rangle-...$

.

Four-dimensional tensors are structurally simpler than 3D tensors.

== Decomposition of polynomials in terms of harmonic functions ==
Applying the contraction rules allows decomposing the tensor with respect to the harmonic ones. In the perturbation theory, even the third approximation often considered good. Here, the decomposition of the tensor power up to the rank l=6 is presented:

$\bullet\ l=2$, $\qquad 3x_ix_k=\mathbf{M }^{(2)}_{ik} + r^2\delta_{ik }$,

$\bullet\ l=3$, $\qquad 5!!x_ix_kx_m=\mathbf{M }^{(3)}_{ikm} + 3r^2\left\langle\left\langle\delta_{ik}x_m \right\rangle\right\rangle$,

$\bullet\ l=4$, $\qquad 7!!x_ix_kx_lx_m=\mathbf{M }^{(4)}_{iklm} + 5r^2\left\langle\left\langle\mathbf{M}^{(2)}_{ik } \delta_{lm} \right\rangle\right\rangle + 7r^4\left\langle\left\langle\delta_{ik } \delta_{lm} \right\rangle\right\rangle$,

$\bullet\ l=5$, $\qquad 9!!x_ix_kx_lx_mx_n=\mathbf{M }^{(5)}_{iklmn} + 7r^2\left\langle\left\langle\mathbf{M}^{(3)}_{ikl } \delta_{mn} \right\rangle\right\rangle + 27r^4\left\langle\left\langle\delta_{ik } \delta_{lm}x_n \right\rangle\right\rangle$ ,

$\bullet\ l=6$, $\qquad 11!!x_ix_kx_lx_mx_nx_p=$:$\qquad\qquad\qquad=\mathbf{M }^{(6)}_{iklmnp} + 9r^2\left\langle\left\langle\mathbf{M}^{(4)}_{iklm } \delta_{np} \right\rangle\right\rangle + 55r^4\left\langle\left\langle\mathbf{M }^{(2)}_{ik}\delta_{lm } \delta_{np} \right\rangle\right\rangle + 99r^6\left\langle\left\langle\delta_{ik } \delta_{lm}\delta_{np } \right\rangle\right\rangle$.

To derive the formulas, it is useful to calculate the contraction with respect two indices, i.e., the trace. The formula for $l=6$ then implies the formula for $l=4$ . Applying the trace, there is convenient to use rules of previous section. Particular, the last term of the relations for even values of $l$ has the form

$$\frac{2l-1)!!}{(l+1)!!}$$.

Also useful is the frequently occurring contraction over all indices,

$$(\mathbf{ M }^{(l ) }_{[i] },\mathbf{ M }^{(l ) }_{[i] })= (\mathbf{ M }^{(l ) }_{i...k }(\mathbf{x } ),\mathbf{ M }^{(l ) }_{i...k }(\mathbf{x } ))= \frac{(2l)! }{ 2^l } r^{ 2l }$$

which arises when normalizing the states.

== Decomposition of polynomials in 4D space ==
The decomposition of tensor powers of a vector is also compact in four dimensions:

$\bullet\ n=2$, $\qquad 4!!x_ix_k=\mathfrak{M }^{(2)}_{ik} + 2r^2\delta_{ik }$,

$\bullet\ n=3$, $\qquad 6!!x_ix_kx_m=\mathfrak {M }^{(3)}_{ikm} + 8r^2\left\langle\left\langle\delta_{ik}x_m \right\rangle\right\rangle$,

$\bullet\ n=4$, $\qquad 8!!x_ix_kx_lx_m=\mathfrak{M }^{(4)}_{iklm} + 6r^2\left\langle\left\langle\mathfrak{M}^{(2)}_{ik } \delta_{lm} \right\rangle\right\rangle + 16r^4\left\langle\left\langle\delta_{ik } \delta_{lm} \right\rangle\right\rangle$,

$\bullet\ n=5$, $\qquad 10!!x_ix_kx_lx_mx_n=\mathfrak{M }^{(5)}_{iklmn} + 8r^2\left\langle\left\langle\mathfrak{M}^{(3)}_{ikl } \delta_{mn} \right\rangle\right\rangle + 80r^4\left\langle\left\langle\delta_{ik } \delta_{lm}x_n \right\rangle\right\rangle$ ,

$\bullet\ n=6$, $\qquad 12!!x_ix_kx_lx_mx_nx_p=$:$\qquad\qquad\qquad=\mathfrak{M }^{(6)}_{iklmnp} + 10r^2\left\langle\left\langle\mathfrak {M}^{(4)}_{iklm } \delta_{np} \right\rangle\right\rangle + 72r^4\left\langle\left\langle\mathfrak{M }^{(2)}_{ik}\delta_{lm } \delta_{np} \right\rangle\right\rangle + 240r^6\left\langle\left\langle\delta_{ik } \delta_{lm}\delta_{np } \right\rangle\right\rangle$.

When using the tensor notation with indices suppressed, the last equality becomes

$\bullet\ n=6$, $\qquad 12!!\mathbf{x}^{\otimes(6 ) }=\mathfrak{M }^{(6)}_{[i]} + 10r^2\left\langle\left\langle\mathfrak \mathfrak{M}^{(4)}_{[i] } \delta_{[..]} \right\rangle\right\rangle + 72r^4\left\langle\left\langle\mathfrak{M }^{(2)}_{[i]}\delta_{[..] }^{\otimes 2} \right\rangle\right\rangle + 240r^6\left\langle\left\langle\delta_{[..] }^{\otimes 3 } \right\rangle\right\rangle$.

Decomposition of higher powers is not more difficult using contractions over two indices.

== Ladder operator ==
Ladder operators are useful for representing eigen functions in a compact form. They are a basis for constructing coherent states . Operators considered here, in mani respects close to the 'creation' and 'annihilation' operators of an oscillator.

Efimov's operator $\mathbf {\hat D }$ that increases the value of rank by one was introduced in . It can be obtained from expansion of point-charge potential:

$$\mathbf{ \nabla}_i\frac {\mathbf{ M}^{(l )}_{k...m }(\mathbf{r} ) } { r^{ 2l+1 } } =-    \frac {\mathbf{ M}^{(l+1)}_{ik...m }(\mathbf{r} ) } { r^{ 2l+3 } }$$.

Straightforward differentiation on the left-hand side of the equation yields a vector operator acting on a harmonic tensor:

$$\hat D_i M^{ (l ) }_{k...m }(\mathbf r)= M^{ (l+1 ) }_{ik...m }(\mathbf r)$$,

$\mathbf{ \hat D} =(2\hat l-1)\mathbf{ r }-r^2 \mathbf{\nabla},$

where operator

$$\hat l= (\mathbf{r}\mathbf{\nabla} )$$

multiplies homogeneous polynomial by degree of homogeneity $l$. In particular,

$$\hat D_i x_k=3x_ix_k-r^2\delta{ik}$$,
$$\hat D_i \hat D_k\hat D_m 1 =3[5x_ix_kx_m-r^2(\delta_{ik}x_m +\delta_{km}x_i +\delta_{im}x_k)]$$.

As a result of an $l$- fold application to unity, the harmonic tensor arises:

$$\hat D_i\hat D_k...\hat D_m \mathbf{1}= M^{(l)} _{ik...m } =\mathbf{D}^{ \otimes l }_{[i] }=
\mathbf{M}^{( l )}_{[i]}$$,

written here in different forms.

The relation of this tensor to the angular momentum operator $\hat\mathbf{L}$ $(\hbar=1 )$ is as follows:

$$\mathbf{\hat{D} }=\hat{ l}\mathbf{r}+i[\mathbf{r }\times \mathbf{\hat{ L} } ]$$.

Some useful properties of the operator in vector form given below. Scalar product

$$\hat D_i \hat D_i=r^2 \Delta$$

yields a vanishing trace over any two indices. The scalar product of vectors $\hat\mathbf{ D}$ and $\mathbf{ x }$ is

$$\mathbf{x }\hat\mathbf{D } =r^2(\hat l+1 )$$,
$$\hat\mathbf{D }\mathbf{x } =r^2 \hat l$$,

and, hence, the contraction of the tensor with the vector $\mathbf{ x}$ can be expressed as

$$x_iM^{(l)}_{ik...m }=2lr^2 M^{(l-1)}_{k...m }$$,

where $l$ is a number.

The commutator in the scalar product on the sphere is equal to unity:

$$\mathbf {x} \mathbf{D} - \mathbf{D}\mathbf {x} =r^2$$.

To calculate the divergence of a tensor, a useful formula is

$$\mathbf{\nabla}\hat \mathbf{D} = (\hat l+1 )(2 \hat l+3 )$$,

whence

$$\nabla_i \hat M^{(l)}_{ik...m }=l (2l+1 )M^{(l-1)}_{(k...m )}$$

($l$ on the right-hand side is a number).

== Four-dimensional ladder operator ==
The raising operator in 4D space

$$\hat \mathfrak{D}_i \mathfrak {M}^{(n)}_{k...m }(\mathbf{ r },\tau)= \mathfrak {M}^{(n+1)}_{ik...m }(\mathbf{ r },\tau) =\mathfrak {M}^{(n+1)}_{ik...m }(\mathbf{y })$$

has largely similar properties. The main formula for it is

$$\hat \mathfrak{D }=2\hat n\mathbf{ y }-\left |\mathbf {y } \right |^2 \mathbf{\nabla}_{\mathbf{y}},$$

where $y_i$ is a 4D vector, $i=1,2,3,4$,

$$\mathbf{y}=(\mathbf{r },\tau ),\quad \left|\mathbf{ y}\right|^2=\rho^2_{\mathbf{y}}=\mathbf{r}^2+\tau^2$$,

and the $\hat n$ operator multiplies a homogeneous polynomial by its degree. Separating the $\tau$ variable is convenient for physical problems:

$$\hat n=(\mathbf{r}\mathbf{\nabla}_\mathbf{ r } +\tau\frac{\partial } {\partial \tau})=\mathbf{ y }\mathbf{\nabla}_{\mathbf{y}}$$.

In particular,

$$\hat \mathfrak{D}_i\mathbf 1=2y_i,\quad\hat \mathfrak{D}_iy_k=2(4y_iy_k -\rho_{\mathbf{y}}^2 \delta_{ ik } )$$,
$$\hat \mathfrak{D}_i \hat \mathfrak{D}_k\hat \mathfrak{D}_m=4!![6x_ix_kx_m-\rho^2_{\mathbf{y}} (\delta_{ik}x_m+ \delta_{km}x_i+ \delta_{im}x_k) ]$$.

The scalar product of the ladder operator $\hat \mathfrak{D}$ and $y$ is as simple as in 3D space:

$$\mathbf{y} \hat \mathfrak{D}=\hat n_{\mathbf{y}}\rho^2_{\mathbf{y}},\quad \hat \mathfrak{D}\mathbf{y}=(\hat n-2)\rho^2_{\mathbf{y}}$$.

The scalar product of $\hat \mathfrak{D}$ and $\mathbf{ \nabla }$ is

$$\mathbf{\nabla} \hat \mathfrak{D}=2(\hat n+2)^2$$.

The ladder operator is now associated with the angular momentum operator and additional operator of rotations in 4D space $\hat \mathbf{A }$. They perform Lie algebra as the angular momentum and the Laplace-Runge-Lenz operators. Operator $\hat \mathbf{A }$ has the simple form

$$\mathbf{\hat A } = i(\tau \mathbf{\nabla}_{\mathbf{r } }-\mathbf{ r } \frac{\partial}{\partial\tau } )$$.

Separately for the 3D $\mathbf{ r }$ -component and the forth coordinate $\tau$ of the raising operator, formulas are

$$\hat\mathfrak D_{\mathbf{r}} = (\hat n+1 )\mathbf{r}+i[\mathbf{r}\times\hat\mathbf{L}]+i\tau \hat \mathbf{A }$$,

$$\hat\mathfrak D_{\tau} = (\hat n+1 )\tau+i(\mathbf{r}\hat\mathbf{A})$$.

== See also ==
- Tensor
- Spherical harmonics
- Operator (physics)
- Laplace-Runge-Lenz vector
- Angular momentum operator
- Ladder operator
- Multipolar exchange interaction
