= Bingley Grammar School =

Voluntary aided community school in Bingley, West Yorkshire, England

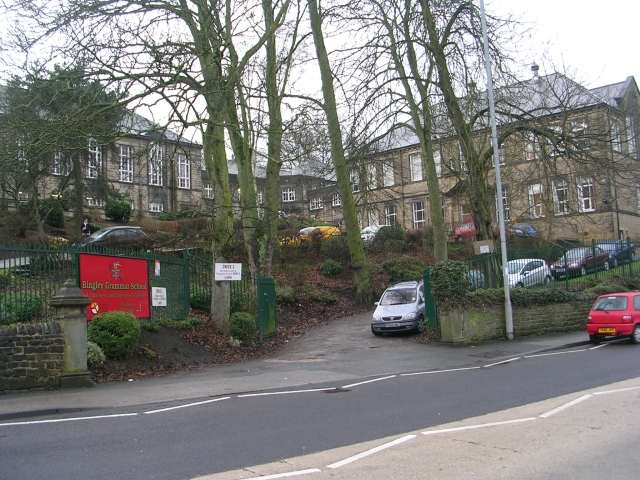
- The school in 2009

Location
- Keighley Road; Bingley, West Yorkshire, BD16 2RS; England; 53.85579°N 1.84604°W

Information
- Type: Comprehensive; Voluntary aided school
- Motto: Passing on the torches of learning Lampada Tradere Nostrum Est
- Established: 1529; 497 years ago
- Local authority: Bradford
- Department for Education URN: 107439 Tables
- Ofsted: Reports
- Chair of Governors: David Mann
- Headmaster: Luke Weston
- Gender: Coeducational
- Age: 11 to 18
- Enrolment: 1,900
- Houses: Milner, Oldfield, Sunderland, Wooller
- Colours: Binglian red, navy, black
- Publication: The Torch (Monthly, defunct) Monthly Newsletter Bingley Grammar Student Variety
- Mascot: Torch
- Website: http://www.bingleygrammar.org/

Bingley Grammar School (BGS) is a coeducational comprehensive voluntary aided school for pupils from the ages of 11 to 18 and is located on the outskirts of Bingley, West Yorkshire, England.

Bingley Grammar School was a specialist school for Business & Enterprise from 2006 to 2011. Due to this, students had previously been required to take Business at GCSE but since the 2010 introduction of the English Baccalaureate this is now no longer mandatory.

== History ==
Bingley Grammar School's long tradition stems from its foundation in 1529, when a series of wealthy benefactors from among the people of Bingley provided a trust to support the education of the young people of the town.

As of 2007, the Foundation Trust Governors meet each term to manage the assets of the trust, and to ensure that the proceeds are used to enhance the education of pupils of the School, now back to its former 'voluntary aided' status. From 2006 to 2011 the school was a Business and Enterprise college, assisted mainly by the voluntary and the Foundation.

The school received media attention in September 2009 when it required female pupils to wear trousers.

In November 2009 two teachers were suspended after it emerged that they accompanied pupils to a live sex show at a bar during a school trip to Bangkok's notorious red light district. As of February 2010 they were back working at the school.

In 2010, the previous headteacher, Mr Chris Taylor, resigned to become the headmaster for a school in West Sussex (Steyning Grammar School). He left during the Easter holidays. The new headteacher, Julia Wright (previously the deputy head of Dixon's Academy), took over in September 2010. Between these two periods, Luke Weston, current head, was the acting headteacher. In March 2012 the quarterly school magazine 'Enterprising Times' stopped production and the e-publication 'The Torch' replaced it in a move to reduce paper consumption in the school.

The school was named in July 2019 as a computing hub for the National Centre for Computing Education.

== Houses ==
The school works on a "house" system, the four houses named after the four founders of the school in 1529. These are Wooller, Milner, Sunderland (introduced in 1952) and Oldfield (introduced in 1967). Pupils can be identified as members of their house by one of the stripes on their ties – Red for Wooller, Blue for Milner, Green for Sunderland, and Yellow for Oldfield.

The houses compete every year in a series of events, from cross country, music and drama. In 2011 it was made compulsory for every pupil to partake in a house competition. This was accompanied with the addition of several competitions e.g. Chess and Scrabble, and some other more strange competitions such as speed texting and an egg and spoon race. These changes were met with considerable criticism by the students.

A sports day event is held each year. The houses also gain points for 'credit stamps' (awarded for good work and behaviour) and aids in winning house competitions. At the end of each year the house with the most points will win the House Cup.

Pupils are also separated into classes within the houses and years. Each Form has one/two tutor(s) who assist in their pupils' daily learning. Students attend form every weekday for half an hour before going to lessons.

During the COVID-19 pandemic, many house activities were suspended – including tutor groups, sports days, and house competitions, though these have once again commenced following the restrictions becoming more lax.

At times the school appeared to have been making internal decisions on whether to change the names of its houses to better reflect its contemporary student body, surveying students regarding potential different names, but no changes have been made.

== 'LORIC' ==
For several years the school has had in place a 'LORIC' system – adapted from the PiXL edge scheme to nurture valuable and employable skills, this stands for 'Leadership', 'Organisation', 'Resilience', 'Initiative', and 'Communication'. Students receive a badge from their form tutor upon completing a task that exemplifies one of the 'LORIC' values. After obtaining all five coloured badges, the student receives a 'LORIC tie' – in contrast to typical house ties, 'LORIC' ties feature a black background with one coloured stripe for each colour of badge. This system paused somewhat during the COVID-19 pandemic due to the lack of tutor groups, but has since recommenced.

== Extra-curricular activities ==
The school competes in local and national competitions at rugby, hockey, netball, swimming, and cricket and basketball. It hosts music groups and ensembles for players of all abilities. Its music department holds concerts and has provided ensembles that have performed outside the school, such as at the Royal Albert Hall.

== Transport ==
The nearest railway station is Crossflatts railway station, and the nearest bus stop is Keighley Road/Harold Street. The bus stop is used by services 662 and 60 which go from Bradford and Leeds (respectively) via Saltaire to Keighley, and vice versa. The K4 shuttles members of the public between Keighley, via East Morton to the school, then heads onto Cullingworth via Wilsden and Harden. To Leeds, Bradford and Keighley there is a frequent service, between 5 and 20 minutes, whereas to Cullingworth there is only one bus on average every hour and sometimes less. Overcrowding is a problem at school opening/closing times, with reports of buses taking up to ten minutes to load all of the passengers, causing severe traffic issues which is not helped by the large numbers of cars collecting/dropping off students. However, this was alleviated slightly in 2003 by the construction of the A650 relief road, colloquially known as "the Bingley Bypass".

There is also a school bus service at BGS, though, over recent years, there has been much controversy over the extreme levels of health and safety with the introduction of the MyBus service.

== Headteachers ==
The headteachers and tenures listed are of the best known accuracy up to 1918, after this there are large gaps.

- Thomas Howgill – 1613–1622
- Richard Waugh – 1623–1636
- Richard Leake – 1640–1641
- Thomas Watkin – 1641–1651
- Lane – 1659–1660
- Thomas Jackson – 1662–1666
- Joseph Rawson – 1666–1674
- Thomas Murgatroyd – 1674–1681
- William Hustler – 1681–1689
- Simeon Jenkinson – 1689–1692
- Henry Hoyle – 1692–1705
- Thomas Ellison – 1711–1724
- Richard Leach – 1725–1742
- Thomas Hudson – 1743–1756
- Thomas Hudson – 1756–1785
- David Greenough – 1785–1791
- Richard Hartley – 1791–1836
- Anthony Metcalfe – 1836–1850
- Thomas Dixon – 1851–1873
- John Sutcliffe – 1873–1901
- Walter Dazeley – 1902–1918
- Alan Smailes – 1918–1950
- John Boston 1950–1967
- L. R. Cottrell 1967–1977
- R. W. Ingham, 1977–1983
- Ian Plimmer 1983–1996
- John Patterson 1996–2006
- Chris Taylor, 2006–2010
- Julia Wright, 2010–2013
- Luke Weston, 2013–present

== Notable alumni ==
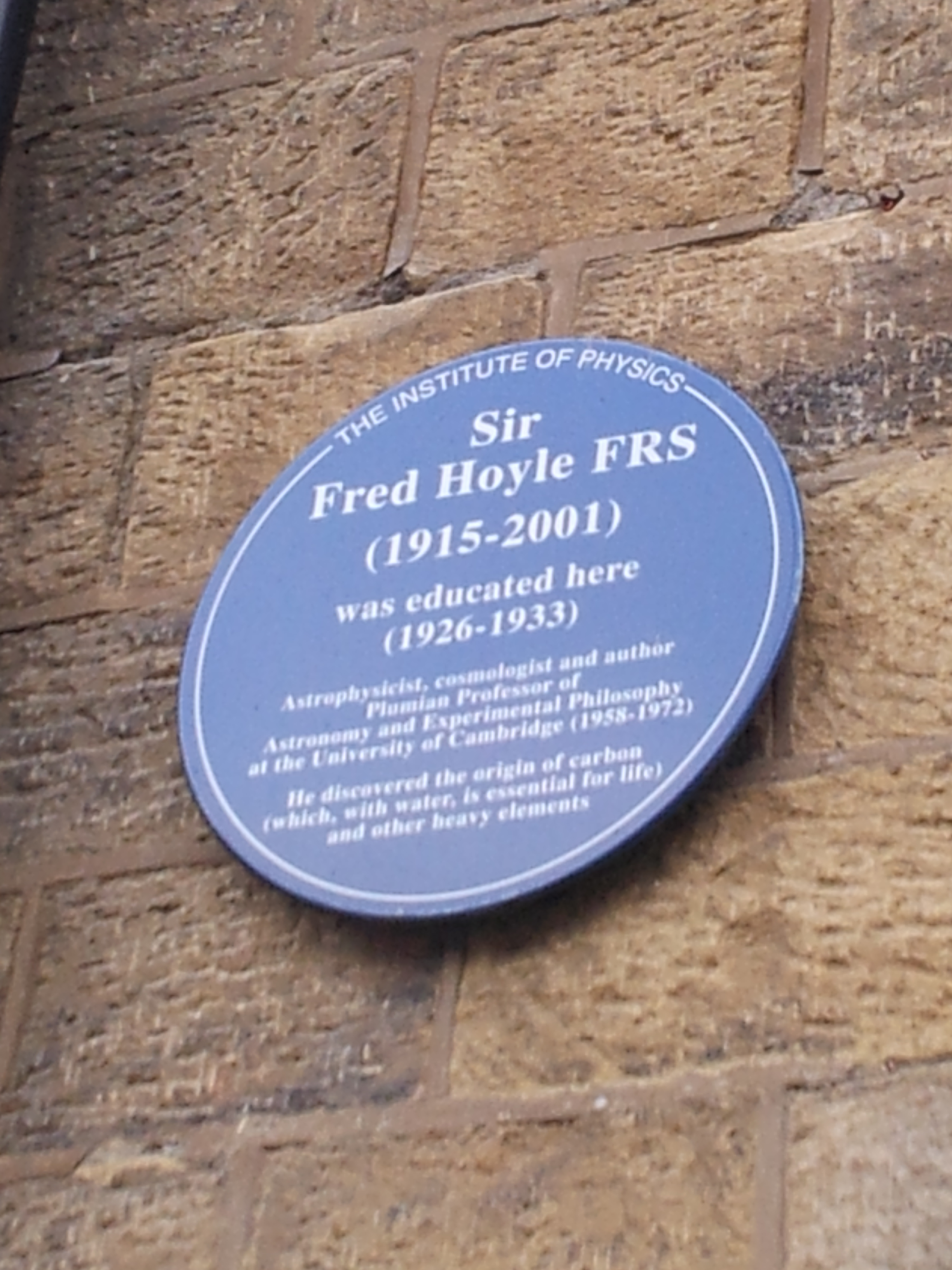
A plaque commemorating Fred Hoyle

- Gareth Batty, cricketer
- Derek Benfield, actor
- Benjamin Gott, a leading figure in the industrial revolution
- Simon Haughton, international Rugby League player who represented Wigan, England and Great Britain.
- Sir Fred Hoyle, a British astronomer – A blue plaque outside the reception from the Institute of Physics commemorates this.
- Erich Peter Wohlfarth, a theoretical physicist best known for his work in magnetism and, in particular, development of the Stoner–Wohlfarth model.
- Christopher Leslie, Labour MP for Nottingham East, formerly MP for Shipley and director of the New Local Government Network.
- Becca Macintyre, Josh Macintyre, Sam Macintyre, Jack Bottomley and William Bottomley – Musicians making up Marmozets.
- Bernard Markham, former bishop of Nassau and the Bahamas.
- Austin Mitchell, Labour Member of Parliament for Great Grimsby (1977–2015)
- John Nicholson, The Airedale Poet.
- Anne Osbourn, plant scientist
- Nigel G. Stocks, an engineer and physicist
- Martin Whitcombe, Leicester Tigers, Yorkshire & England 'B' Rugby Union Player
- John Wilson (industrial chemist)
- Juno Dawson, British transgender activist, and writer of young adult fiction and non-fiction
- Geoffrey Oldham, CBE
