= Arthur Stoner =

English cricketer and umpire

Personal information
- Full name: Arthur Stoner
- Born: 11 May 1870; Streatham, London, England
- Batting: Unknown
- Bowling: Unknown

Domestic team information
- Years: Team
- 1904–1908: Durham
- 1899–1900: Surrey

Career statistics
Competition	First-class
Matches	6
Runs scored	98
Batting average	10.88
100s/50s	–/1
Top score	61
Balls bowled	627
Wickets	14
Bowling average	24.57
5 wickets in innings	–
10 wickets in match	–
Best bowling	4/16
Catches/stumpings	2/–
- Source: Cricinfo, 8 September 2011

Arthur Stoner (11 May 1870 – 1938) was an English cricketer and umpire. Stoner's batting and bowling styles are unknown. He was born in Streatham, London. He is the father of the condensed matter physicist Edmund Clifton Stoner.

Stoner made his first-class debut for Surrey against Cambridge University in 1899. He made five further first-class appearances for Surrey, the last of which came against Leicestershire in the 1900 County Championship. In his six first-class matches, he scored a total of 98 runs at an average of 10.88, with a high score of 61. This score came against Hampshire in 1899. He left Surrey at the end of the 1900 season.

Stoner later joined Durham, making his debut for the county in the Minor Counties Championship against the Yorkshire Second XI. He played Minor counties cricket for Durham from 1904 to 1908, making 26 Minor Counties Championship appearances.

He later stood as an umpire in 54 first-class matches between 1928 and 1934, as well as also standing in a handful of Minor Counties Championship matches.
