= Host adaptation =

When considering pathogens, host adaptation can have varying descriptions. For example, in the case of Salmonella, host adaptation is used to describe the "ability of a pathogen to circulate and cause disease in a particular host population." Another usage of host adaptation, still considering the case of Salmonella, refers to the evolution of a pathogen such that it can infect, cause disease, and circulate in another host species.

== Description ==
While there might be pathogens that can infect other hosts and cause disease, the inability to pervade, or spread, throughout the infected host species indicates that the pathogen is not adapted to that host species. In this case, the ability or lack thereof of a pathogen to adapt to its host environment is an indicator of the pathogen's fitness or virulence. If a pathogen has high fitness in the host environment, or is virulent, it will be able to grow and spread quickly within its host. Conversely, if the pathogen is not well adapted to its host environment, then it will not spread or infect the way a well adapted pathogen would.

Pathogens like Salmonella, which is a food borne pathogen, are able to adapt to the host environment and maintain virulence via several pathways. In a paper by Baumler et al. 1998, characters of Salmonella, such as its ability to cause intestinal infection were attributed to virulence factors like its ability to invade intestinal epithelial cells, induce neutrophil recruitment and interfere with the secretion of intestinal fluid. Phylogenetic analysis also revealed that many strains or lineages of Salmonella exist, which is advantageous for the pathogen because its genetic diversity can acts as fodder for natural selection to tinder with. For instance, if a particular Salmonella strain is more fit in the host stomach environment, compared to other Salmonella strains, then the former will be positively selected for and increase in prevalence. Eventually this strain will colonize and infect the stomach. The other less fit strains will be selected against and will thus not persist. Another major host adaptation on the part of Salmonella was its adaptation to host blood temperatures. Because Salmonella can thrive at the human host temperature, 98.6 degrees F, it is fit for the host environment and hence survives well in it. Adaptations like these are simple yet very effective ways of infecting hosts because they use the host's body and important feature of its body as a stepping stone in the infection process.

Another intestinal pathogen in the genus Cryptosporidium, which was not always a human pathogen, "recently" adapted to the human host environment. Numerous phylogenetic analyses in a paper by Xiao et al. 2002 indicated that the Cryptosporidium parvum bovine genotype and Cryptosporidium meleagridis were originally parasites of rodents and mammals, respectively. However, this parasite 'recently' expanded into humans. As was previously mentioned, the ability to survive in different host species is an adaptation that is highly advantageous to pathogens because it increases their chances for survival and circulation. Some pathogens can evolve to become resistant to the body's natural immune defenses and/or to outside interventions like drugs. For instance, Clostridioides difficile is the most frequent cause of nosocomial diarrhea worldwide, and reports in the early 2000s indicated the advent of a hypervirulent strain in North America and Europe. In study by Stabler et al. 2006, comparative phylogenomics (whole-genome comparisons using DNA microarrays combined with Bayesian phylogenies) were used to model the phylogeny of C. difficile. Phylogenetic analysis identified four distinct statistically significant 'clusters' making a hypervirulent clade, a toxin A− B+ clade, and two clades with human and animal isolates. Genetic differences between the four groups revealed significant findings related to virulence. The authors saw that hypervirulent strains had undergone various types of niche adaptation like antibiotic resistance, motility, adhesion, and enteric metabolism.

Some commensal organisms, or organisms that occur in the body naturally and benefit from living in the host without causing it harm or conferring any significant benefit, also have the potential to become pathogens. This specific type of commensal/pathogen hybrid is called an opportunistic pathogen. Not all commensals are opportunistic pathogens. However, opportunistic pathogens are commensals by nature. They are not harmful to the body when the body's immune system is functioning normally, but if the host immune system becomes compromised, or loses its ability to function at its full or near-full potential, opportunistic pathogens switch from being a commensal organism to a pathogen. This is where the name opportunistic pathogen comes from: they are only pathogens when the opportunity to infect the host is there. An example of an opportunistic pathogen is Candida albicans. Candida albicans is a type of fungus/yeast found in the intestines and mucous membranes (like the vagina and throat) of healthy humans. It is also found on the skin of healthy humans. In healthy humans- meaning humans with functioning immune systems- Candida will not cause infections. It will simply co-exist with the host. However, if a person receives chemotherapy or has HIV/AIDS, which weakens the immune system (thus compromising it), Candida albicans will cause infections. It can cause infections as innocuous as yeast infections or thrush and it can cause infections as serious as systemic candidiasis which is fatal in about 50% of cases. Though the mechanisms Candida albicans uses to switch from being a commensal to a pathogen are largely unknown, the reasons for its strength as a pathogen are broadly known. Candida has plenty of phenotypic and genotypic plasticity which means it generates change quickly. As a result of constant diversification, candida has many opportunities to make advantageous mutations. Additionally, Candida can change morphology. It can convert from the yeast for to the filamentous form and vice versa, depending on which stage of infection it is in. In the beginning stages of infection, Candida is more likely to be in the filamentous form because this allows it to adhere to and infect cells more efficiently. Other adaptations of the commensal pathogen include the ability to grow at host temperature, create biofilms, resist reactive oxygen species (ROS) created as part of the human immune response to fight off infection, adapt to different pHs (relevant for being carried in the blood in different parts of the body) and adapt to low nutrient or low glucose environments like the liver Because Candida albicans is very good at adapting to the fluctuating environments of the humans body (i.e. its changing temperature, pH, oxygen reactivity and more) candida albicans is a good pathogen.

Host adaptation can also be used in reference to the host. Hosts have the ability to adapt to protect themselves against pathogens. For instance, the innate and acquired immune responses are adaptations of the human body that exist for the sole purpose of warding off disease. Additionally, as was previously mentioned with the case of reactive oxygen species, the body has various other ways off warding off threats. Sexual reproduction is also a feature that humans and other sexually reproducing organisms have to protect themselves against pathogens. For instance, in what's called the red queen hypothesis, hosts are constantly shifting genetically via sexual reproduction in order to continue changing so pathogens have less of a chance to be well adjusted to the host. If the host keeps changing via gene shuffling in the form of reproduction, then hosts will have to continuously evolve with the host to keep up with its changes. This sets up a moving target for co-evolving pathogens.
