= Superexchange =

Strong coupling between two cations through an intermediary anion

Superexchange or Kramers–Anderson superexchange interaction, is a prototypical indirect exchange coupling between neighboring magnetic moments (usually next-nearest neighboring cations, see the schematic illustration of MnO below) by virtue of exchanging electrons through a non-magnetic anion known as the superexchange center. In this way, it differs from direct exchange, in which there is direct overlap of electron wave function from nearest neighboring cations not involving an intermediary anion or exchange center. While direct exchange can be either ferromagnetic or antiferromagnetic, the superexchange interaction is usually antiferromagnetic, preferring opposite alignment of the connected magnetic moments. Similar to the direct exchange, superexchange calls for the combined effect of Pauli exclusion principle and Coulomb's repulsion of the electrons. If the superexchange center and the magnetic moments it connects to are non-collinear, namely the atomic bonds are canted, the superexchange will be accompanied by the antisymmetric exchange known as the Dzyaloshinskii–Moriya interaction, which prefers orthogonal alignment of neighboring magnetic moments. In this situation, the symmetric and antisymmetric contributions compete with each other and can result in versatile magnetic spin textures such as magnetic skyrmions.

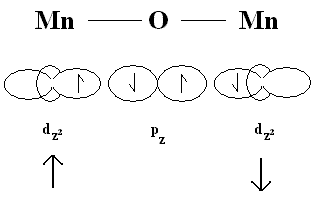
Superexchange for MnO

Superexchange was theoretically proposed by Hendrik Kramers in 1934, when he noticed that in crystals like Manganese(II) oxide (MnO), there are manganese atoms that interact with one another despite having nonmagnetic oxygen atoms between them. Phillip Anderson later refined Kramers' model in 1950.

A set of semi-empirical rules were developed by John B. Goodenough and Junjiro Kanamori in the 1950s. These rules, now referred to as the Goodenough–Kanamori rules, or the Goodenough–Kanamori–Anderson rules when Anderson's theoretical treatment is included, have proven highly successful in rationalizing the magnetic properties of a wide range of materials on a qualitative level. They are based on the symmetry relations and electron occupancy of the overlapping atomic orbitals (assuming the localized Heitler–London, or valence-bond, model is more representative of the chemical bonding than is the delocalized, or Hund–Mulliken–Bloch, model). Essentially, the Pauli exclusion principle dictates that between two magnetic ions with half-occupied orbitals, which couple through an intermediary non-magnetic ion (e.g. O^{2−}), the superexchange will be strongly anti-ferromagnetic while the coupling between an ion with a filled orbital and one with a half-filled orbital will be ferromagnetic. The coupling between an ion with either a half-filled or filled orbital and one with a vacant orbital can be either antiferromagnetic or ferromagnetic, but generally favors ferromagnetic. In common 180° cation–anion–cation geometries, overlap between half-filled orbitals usually gives strong antiferromagnetic exchange, whereas near-90° geometries or orthogonal orbitals can weaken the antiferromagnetic path and allow ferromagnetic exchange to dominate. When multiple types of interactions are present simultaneously, the antiferromagnetic one is generally dominant, since it is independent of the intra-atomic exchange term. For simple cases, the Goodenough–Kanamori rules readily allow the prediction of the net magnetic exchange expected for the coupling between ions. Complications begin to arise in various situations:

1. when direct exchange and superexchange mechanisms compete with one another;
2. when the cation–anion–cation bond angle deviates away from 180°;
3. when the electron occupancy of the orbitals is non-static, or dynamical;
4. and when spin–orbit coupling becomes important.

Double exchange is a related magnetic coupling interaction proposed by Clarence Zener to account for electrical transport properties. It differs from superexchange in the following manner: in superexchange, the occupancy of the d-shell of the two metal ions is the same or differs by two, and the electrons are localized. For other occupations (double exchange), the electrons are itinerant (delocalized); this results in the material displaying magnetic exchange coupling, as well as metallic conductivity.

== Manganese oxide ==
The p orbitals from oxygen and d orbitals from manganese can form a direct exchange. There is antiferromagnetic order because the singlet state is energetically favoured. This configuration allows a delocalization of the involved electrons due to a lowering of the kinetic energy.

Quantum-mechanical perturbation theory results in an antiferromagnetic interaction of the spins of neighboring Mn atoms with the energy operator (Hamiltonian)

$$\mathcal H_{1, 2} = +\frac{2t_\text{Mn,O}^2}{U} \hat S_1 \cdot \hat S_2,$$

where t_{Mn,O} is the so-called hopping energy between a Mn 3d and the oxygen p orbitals, while U is a so-called Hubbard energy for Mn. The expression $\hat S_1 \cdot \hat S_2$ is the scalar product between the Mn spin-vector operators (Heisenberg model).

== Superexchange interactions in general ==
It has been proven, that due to the multiple energy scales present in the model for superexchange, perturbation theory is not in general convergent, and is thus not an appropriate method for deriving this interaction between spins and that this undoubtedly accounts for the incorrect qualitative characterization of some transition-metal oxide compounds as Mott-Hubbard, rather than Charge-Transfer, insulators. This is particularly apparent whenever the p-d orbital energy difference is not extremely large, compared with the d-electron correlation energy U.
