= Double-exchange mechanism =

Magnetic exchange between ions in different oxidation states

The double-exchange mechanism is a type of a magnetic exchange that may arise between ions in different oxidation states. First proposed by Clarence Zener, this theory predicts the relative ease with which an electron may be exchanged between two species and has important implications for whether materials are ferromagnetic, antiferromagnetic, or exhibit spiral magnetism. For example, consider in Lanthanum strontium manganite (LSMO), La_{1-x}Sr_{x}MnO_{3}, the 180 degree interaction of Mn-O-Mn in which the Mn "e_{g}" orbitals are directly interacting with the O "2p" orbitals, and one of the Mn cations has more electrons than the other. In the ground state, electrons on each Mn ion are aligned with parallel spins, according to the Hund's rule of maximum multiplicity:

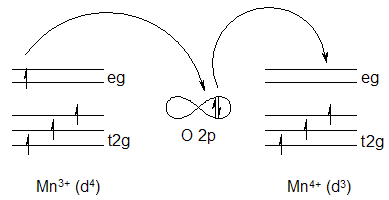
An example of double exchange in the compound $La_{1-x}A_x Mn O_3$. The exchange involves the outermost orbitals for each atom, which are 3d^{4} for Mn^{3+}, 3d^{3} for Mn^{4+}, and 2p^{6} for the O^{2-}. Here e_{g} and t_{2g} are crystal field theory notation for the octahedral splitting of the d-orbitals.

If O gives up its spin-up electron to Mn^{4+}, its vacant orbital can then be filled by an electron from Mn^{3+}. At the end of the process, an electron has moved between the neighboring metal ions, retaining its spin. The double-exchange predicts that this electron movement from one species to another will be facilitated more easily if the electrons do not have to change spin direction in order to conform with Hund's rules when on the accepting species. The ability to hop (to delocalize) reduces the kinetic energy. Hence the overall energy saving can lead to ferromagnetic alignment of neighboring ions.

This model is superficially similar to superexchange. However, in superexchange, a ferromagnetic or antiferromagnetic alignment occurs between two atoms with the same valence (number of electrons); while in double-exchange, the interaction occurs only when one atom has an extra electron compared to the other.
