= Ferromagnetism =

Mechanism by which materials form into and are attracted to magnets

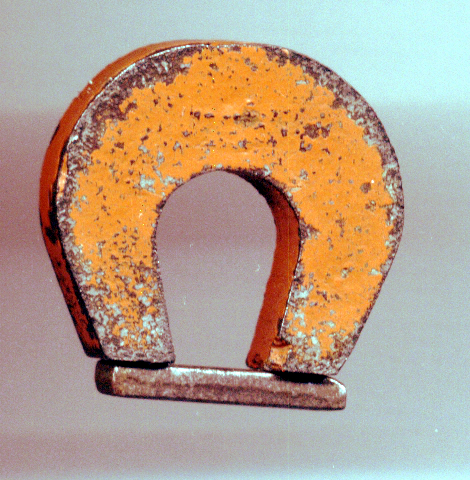
A magnet made of alnico, a ferromagnetic iron alloy, with its keeper

Paramagnetism, ferromagnetism, and spin waves

Ferromagnetism is a property of certain materials (such as iron) that results in a significant, observable magnetic permeability, and in many cases, a significant magnetic coercivity, allowing the material to form a permanent magnet. Ferromagnetic materials are noticeably attracted to a magnet, which is a consequence of their substantial magnetic permeability.

Magnetic permeability describes the induced magnetization of a material due to the presence of an external magnetic field. For example, this temporary magnetization inside a steel plate accounts for the plate's attraction to a magnet. Whether or not that steel plate then acquires permanent magnetization depends on both the strength of the applied field and on the coercivity of that particular piece of steel (which varies with the steel's chemical composition and any heat treatment it may have undergone).

In physics, multiple types of material magnetism have been distinguished. Ferromagnetism (along with the similar effect ferrimagnetism) is the strongest type and is responsible for the common phenomenon of everyday magnetism. A common example of a permanent magnet is a refrigerator magnet. Substances respond weakly to magnetic fields by three other types of magnetism—paramagnetism, diamagnetism, and antiferromagnetism—but the forces are usually so weak that they can only be detected by lab instruments.

Permanent magnets (materials that can be magnetized by an external magnetic field and remain magnetized after the external field is removed) are either ferromagnetic or ferrimagnetic, as are the materials that are strongly attracted to them. Relatively few materials are ferromagnetic; the common ones are the metals iron, cobalt, nickel and most of their alloys, and certain rare-earth metals.

Ferromagnetism is widely used in industrial applications and modern technology, in electromagnetic and electromechanical devices such as electromagnets, electric motors, generators, transformers, magnetic storage (including tape recorders and hard disks), and nondestructive testing of ferrous materials.

Ferromagnetic materials can be divided into magnetically "soft" materials (like annealed iron) having low coercivity, which do not tend to stay magnetized, and magnetically "hard" materials having high coercivity, which do. Permanent magnets are made from hard ferromagnetic materials (such as alnico) and ferrimagnetic materials (such as ferrite) that are subjected to special processing in a strong magnetic field during manufacturing to align their internal microcrystalline structure, making them difficult to demagnetize. To demagnetize a saturated magnet, a magnetic field must be applied. The threshold at which demagnetization occurs depends on the coercivity of the material. The overall strength of a magnet is measured by its magnetic moment or, alternatively, its total magnetic flux. The local strength of magnetism in a material is measured by its magnetization.

== Terms ==
Ferromagnetic material: all the molecular magnetic dipoles are pointed in the same direction

Ferrimagnetic material: some of the dipoles point in the opposite direction, but their smaller contribution is overcome by the others

Historically, the term ferromagnetism was used for any material that could exhibit spontaneous magnetization: a net magnetic moment in the absence of an external magnetic field; that is, any material that could become a magnet. This definition is still in common use.

In 1948, Louis Néel showed that spontaneous magnetization can arise from two distinct types of magnetic ordering. In true ferromagnetic materials, all magnetic moments are aligned parallel to one another. Conversely, in ferrimagnetism, magnetic moments are arranged in two antiparallel sublattices with different magnitudes, resulting in a net magnetization. When these opposing moments are equal in magnitude and thus cancel completely, spontaneous magnetization cannot occur. This is called antiferromagnetism.

== Materials ==
Curie temperatures for some crystalline ferromagnetic and ferrimagnetic materials
Material	Curie temp. (K)
Co	1388
Fe	1043
Fe_{2}O_{3} (Note: Ferrimagnetic material)	948
NiOFe_{2}O_{3}	858
CuOFe_{2}O_{3}	728
MgOFe_{2}O_{3}	713
MnBi	630
Ni	627
Nd_{2}Fe_{14}B	593
MnSb	587
MnOFe_{2}O_{3}	573
Y_{3}Fe_{5}O_{12}	560
CrO_{2}	386
MnAs	318
Gd	292
Tb	219
Dy	88
EuO	69

Ferromagnetism is an unusual property that occurs in only a few substances. The common ones are the transition metals iron, nickel, and cobalt, as well as their alloys and alloys of rare-earth metals. It is a property not just of the chemical make-up of a material, but of its crystalline structure and microstructure. Ferromagnetism results from these materials having many unpaired electrons in their d-block (in the case of iron and its relatives) or f-block (in the case of the rare-earth metals), a result of Hund's rule of maximum multiplicity. There are ferromagnetic metal alloys whose constituents are not themselves ferromagnetic, called Heusler alloys, named after Fritz Heusler. Conversely, there are non-magnetic alloys, such as types of stainless steel, composed almost exclusively of ferromagnetic metals.

Amorphous (non-crystalline) ferromagnetic metallic alloys are sometimes called asperomagnets. These can be made by very rapid quenching (cooling) of an alloy. These have the advantage that their properties are nearly isotropic (not aligned along a crystal axis); this results in low coercivity, low hysteresis loss, high permeability, and high electrical resistivity. One such typical material is a transition metal-metalloid alloy, made from about 80% transition metal (usually Fe, Co, or Ni) and a metalloid component (B, C, Si, P, or Al) that lowers the melting point.

A relatively new class of exceptionally strong ferromagnetic materials are the rare-earth magnets. They contain lanthanide elements that are known for their ability to carry large magnetic moments in well-localized f-orbitals.

The table lists a selection of ferromagnetic and ferrimagnetic compounds, along with their Curie temperature (T_{C}), above which they cease to exhibit spontaneous magnetization.

=== Unusual materials ===
Most ferromagnetic materials are metals, since the conducting electrons are often responsible for mediating the ferromagnetic interactions. It is therefore a challenge to develop ferromagnetic insulators, especially multiferroic materials, which are both ferromagnetic and ferroelectric.

A number of actinide compounds are ferromagnets at room temperature or exhibit ferromagnetism upon cooling. PuP is a paramagnet with cubic symmetry at room temperature, but which undergoes a structural transition into a tetragonal state with ferromagnetic order when cooled below its T_{C} = 125 K. In its ferromagnetic state, PuP's easy axis is in the ⟨100⟩ direction.

In NpFe_{2} the easy axis is ⟨111⟩. Above T_{C} ≈ 500 K, NpFe_{2} is also paramagnetic and cubic. Cooling below the Curie temperature produces a rhombohedral distortion wherein the rhombohedral angle changes from 60° (cubic phase) to 60.53°. An alternate description of this distortion is to consider the length c along the unique trigonal axis (after the distortion has begun) and a as the distance in the plane perpendicular to c. In the cubic phase this reduces to c/a = 1.00. Below the Curie temperature, the lattice acquires a distortion

$$\frac{c}{a} - 1 = -(120 \pm 5) \times 10^{-4},$$

which is the largest strain in any actinide compound. NpNi_{2} undergoes a similar lattice distortion below T_{C} = 32 K, with a strain of (43 ± 5) × 10^{−4}. NpCo_{2} is a ferrimagnet below 15 K.

In 2009, a team of MIT physicists demonstrated that a lithium gas cooled to less than one kelvin can exhibit ferromagnetism. The team cooled fermionic lithium-6 to less than 150 nK (150 billionths of one kelvin) using infrared laser cooling. This demonstration is the first time that ferromagnetism has been demonstrated in a gas.

In rare circumstances, ferromagnetism can be observed in compounds consisting of only s-block and p-block elements, such as rubidium sesquioxide.

In 2018, a team of University of Minnesota physicists demonstrated that body-centered tetragonal ruthenium exhibits ferromagnetism at room temperature.

=== Electrically induced ferromagnetism ===
Recent research has shown evidence that ferromagnetism can be induced in some materials by an electric current or voltage. Antiferromagnetic LaMnO_{3} and SrCoO have been switched to be ferromagnetic by a current. In July 2020, scientists reported inducing ferromagnetism in the abundant diamagnetic material iron pyrite ("fool's gold") by an applied voltage. In these experiments, the ferromagnetism was limited to a thin surface layer.

== Explanation ==
The Bohr–Van Leeuwen theorem, discovered in the 1910s, showed that classical physics theories are unable to account for any form of material magnetism, including ferromagnetism; the explanation rather depends on the quantum mechanical description of atoms. Each of an atom's electrons has a magnetic moment according to its spin state, as described by quantum mechanics. The Pauli exclusion principle, also a consequence of quantum mechanics, restricts the occupancy of electrons' spin states in atomic orbitals, generally causing the magnetic moments from an atom's electrons to largely or completely cancel. An atom will have a net magnetic moment when that cancellation is incomplete.

=== Origin of atomic magnetism ===
One of the fundamental properties of an electron (besides that it carries charge) is that it has a magnetic dipole moment, i.e., it behaves like a tiny magnet, producing a magnetic field. This dipole moment comes from a more fundamental property of the electron: its quantum mechanical spin. Due to its quantum nature, the spin of the electron can be in one of only two states, with the magnetic field either pointing "up" or "down" (for any choice of up and down). Electron spin in atoms is the main source of ferromagnetism, although there is also a contribution from the orbital angular momentum of the electron about the nucleus. When these magnetic dipoles in a piece of matter are aligned (point in the same direction), their individually tiny magnetic fields add together to create a much larger macroscopic field.

However, materials made of atoms with filled electron shells have a total dipole moment of zero: because the electrons all exist in pairs with opposite spin, every electron's magnetic moment is cancelled by the opposite moment of the second electron in the pair. Only atoms with partially filled shells (i.e., unpaired spins) can have a net magnetic moment, so ferromagnetism occurs only in materials with partially filled shells. Because of Hund's rules, the first few electrons in an otherwise unoccupied shell tend to have the same spin, thereby increasing the total dipole moment.

These unpaired dipoles (often called simply "spins", even though they also generally include orbital angular momentum) tend to align in parallel to an external magnetic field – leading to a macroscopic effect called paramagnetism. In ferromagnetism, however, the magnetic interaction between neighboring atoms' magnetic dipoles is strong enough that they align with each other regardless of any applied field, resulting in the spontaneous magnetization of so-called domains. This results in the large observed magnetic permeability of ferromagnetics, and the ability of magnetically hard materials to form permanent magnets.

=== Exchange interaction ===
When two nearby atoms have unpaired electrons, whether the electron spins are parallel or antiparallel affects whether the electrons can share the same orbit as a result of the quantum mechanical effect called the exchange interaction. This in turn affects the electron location and the Coulomb (electrostatic) interaction and thus the energy difference between these states.

The exchange interaction is related to the Pauli exclusion principle, which says that two electrons with the same spin cannot also be in the same spatial state (orbital). This is a consequence of the spin–statistics theorem and that electrons are fermions. Therefore, under certain conditions, when the orbitals of the unpaired outer valence electrons from adjacent atoms overlap, the distributions of their electric charge in space are farther apart when the electrons have parallel spins than when they have opposite spins. This reduces the electrostatic energy of the electrons when their spins are parallel compared to their energy when the spins are antiparallel, so the parallel-spin state is more stable. This difference in energy is called the exchange energy. In simple terms, the outer electrons of adjacent atoms, which repel each other, can move further apart by aligning their spins in the same direction.

This energy difference can be orders of magnitude larger than the energy differences associated with the magnetic dipole–dipole interaction due to dipole orientation, which tends to align the dipoles antiparallel. In certain doped semiconductor oxides, RKKY interactions have been shown to bring about periodic longer-range magnetic interactions, a phenomenon of significance in the study of spintronic materials.

The materials in which the exchange interaction is much stronger than the competing dipole–dipole interaction are frequently called magnetic materials. For instance, in iron (Fe) the exchange force is about 1,000 times stronger than the dipole interaction. Therefore, below the Curie temperature, virtually all of the dipoles in a ferromagnetic material will be aligned. In addition to ferromagnetism, the exchange interaction is also responsible for the other types of spontaneous ordering of atomic magnetic moments occurring in magnetic solids: antiferromagnetism and ferrimagnetism. There are different exchange interaction mechanisms which create the magnetism in different ferromagnetic, ferrimagnetic, and antiferromagnetic substances—these mechanisms include direct exchange, RKKY exchange, double exchange, and superexchange.

=== Magnetic anisotropy ===
Although the exchange interaction keeps spins aligned, it does not align them in a particular direction. Without magnetic anisotropy, the spins in a magnet randomly change direction in response to thermal fluctuations, and the magnet is superparamagnetic. There are several kinds of magnetic anisotropy, the most common of which is magnetocrystalline anisotropy. This is a dependence of the energy on the direction of magnetization relative to the crystallographic lattice. Another common source of anisotropy, inverse magnetostriction, is induced by internal strains. Single-domain magnets also can have a shape anisotropy due to the magnetostatic effects of the particle shape. As the temperature of a magnet increases, the anisotropy tends to decrease, and there is often a blocking temperature at which a transition to superparamagnetism occurs.

=== Magnetic domains ===
Electromagnetic dynamic magnetic domain motion of grain-oriented electrical silicon steel

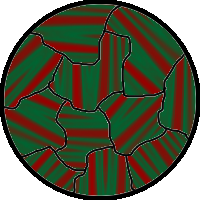
Kerr micrograph of a metal surface showing magnetic domains, with red and green stripes denoting opposite magnetization directions

The spontaneous alignment of magnetic dipoles in ferromagnetic materials would seem to suggest that every piece of ferromagnetic material should have a strong magnetic field, since all the spins are aligned; yet iron and other ferromagnets are often found in an "unmagnetized" state. This is because a bulk piece of ferromagnetic material is divided into tiny regions called magnetic domains (also known as Weiss domains). Within each domain, the spins are aligned, but if the bulk material is in its lowest energy configuration (i.e. "unmagnetized"), the spins of separate domains point in different directions and their magnetic fields cancel out, so the bulk material has no net large-scale magnetic field.

Ferromagnetic materials spontaneously divide into magnetic domains because the exchange interaction is a short-range force, so over long distances of many atoms, the tendency of the magnetic dipoles to reduce their energy by orienting in opposite directions wins out. If all the dipoles in a piece of ferromagnetic material are aligned parallel, it creates a large magnetic field extending into the space around it. This contains a lot of magnetostatic energy. The material can reduce this energy by splitting into many domains pointing in different directions, so the magnetic field is confined to small local fields in the material, reducing the volume of the field. The domains are separated by thin domain walls a number of molecules thick, in which the direction of magnetization of the dipoles rotates smoothly from one domain's direction to the other.

=== Magnetized materials ===
Moving domain walls in a grain of silicon steel caused by an increasing external magnetic field in the "downward" direction, observed in a Kerr microscope. White areas are domains with magnetization directed up, dark areas are domains with magnetization directed down.

Thus, a piece of iron in its lowest energy state ("unmagnetized") generally has little or no net magnetic field. However, the magnetic domains in a material are not fixed in place; they are simply regions where the spins of the electrons have aligned spontaneously due to their magnetic fields, and thus can be altered by an external magnetic field. If a strong-enough external magnetic field is applied to the material, the domain walls will move via a process in which the spins of the electrons in atoms near the wall in one domain turn under the influence of the external field to face in the same direction as the electrons in the other domain, thus reorienting the domains so more of the dipoles are aligned with the external field. The domains will remain aligned when the external field is removed, and sum to create a magnetic field of their own extending into the space around the material, thus creating a "permanent" magnet. The domains do not go back to their original minimum energy configuration when the field is removed because the domain walls tend to become 'pinned' or 'snagged' on defects in the crystal lattice, preserving their parallel orientation. This is shown by the Barkhausen effect: as the magnetizing field is changed, the material's magnetization changes in thousands of tiny discontinuous jumps as domain walls suddenly "snap" past defects.

This magnetization as a function of an external field is described by a hysteresis curve. Although this state of aligned domains found in a piece of magnetized ferromagnetic material is not a minimal-energy configuration, it is metastable, and can persist for long periods, as shown by samples of magnetite from the sea floor which have maintained their magnetization for millions of years.

Heating and then cooling (annealing) a magnetized material, subjecting it to vibration by hammering it, or applying a rapidly oscillating magnetic field from a degaussing coil tends to release the domain walls from their pinned state, and the domain boundaries tend to move back to a lower energy configuration with less external magnetic field, thus demagnetizing the material.

Commercial magnets are made of "hard" ferromagnetic or ferrimagnetic materials with very large magnetic anisotropy such as alnico and ferrites, which have a very strong tendency for the magnetization to be pointed along one axis of the crystal, the "easy axis". During manufacture the materials are subjected to various metallurgical processes in a powerful magnetic field, which aligns the crystal grains so their "easy" axes of magnetization all point in the same direction. Thus, the magnetization, and the resulting magnetic field, is "built in" to the crystal structure of the material, making it very difficult to demagnetize.

=== Curie temperature ===
As the temperature of a material increases, thermal motion, or entropy, competes with the ferromagnetic tendency for dipoles to align. When the temperature rises beyond a certain point, called the Curie temperature, there is a second-order phase transition and the system can no longer maintain a spontaneous magnetization, so its ability to be magnetized or attracted to a magnet disappears, although it still responds paramagnetically to an external field. Below that temperature, there is a spontaneous symmetry breaking and magnetic moments become aligned with their neighbors. The Curie temperature itself is a critical point, where the magnetic susceptibility is theoretically infinite and, although there is no net magnetization, domain-like spin correlations fluctuate at all length scales.

== See also ==
- Ferromagnetic material properties
- Hysteresis – Dependence of the state of a system on its history
- Neodymium magnet – Strongest type of permanent magnet from an alloy of neodymium, iron and boron
- Orbital magnetization – Quantized magnetization of charged particles
- Stoner criterion – Condition for ferromagnetism
- Thermo-magnetic motor – Magnet motor
