= Index of physics articles (0–9) =

The index of physics articles is split into multiple pages due to its size.

To navigate by individual letter use the table of contents below.

== 0–9 ==
- 1/N expansion
- 100 Authors Against Einstein
- 120° parhelion
- 1958 Lituya Bay megatsunami
- 1964 PRL symmetry breaking papers
- 1s Slater-type function
- 22° halo
- 23rd International Solvay Conference in Physics
- 3-j symbol
- 331 model
- 3D ultrasound
- 46° halo
- 4GLS
- 4Pi Microscope
- 4Pi STED microscopy
- 4 pi laser
- 5 dimensional warped geometry theory
- 6-j symbol
- 9-j symbol
