= Adolfas Jucys =

Lithuanian theoretical physicist

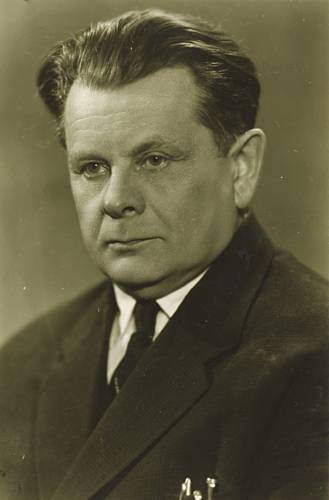
- Born: September 12, 1904; Klausgalvų Medsėdžiai, Russian Empire (present-day Lithuania)
- Died: February 4, 1974 (aged 69); Vilnius, Lithuania
- Education: Kaunas Vytautas Magnus University
- Scientific career
- Fields: Theoretical Atomic spectroscopy, Theory of angular momentum
- Academic advisors: Douglas Hartree, Vladimir Fock

Adolfas Pranaitis Jucys (12 September 1904 – 4 February 1974; also referred to as Yutsis, Yuzis, or Ioucis depending on translation) was a Lithuanian theoretical physicist, and inducted member of the Lithuanian Academy of Sciences in 1953, participated in mathematics. He graduated from Kaunas University in 1931 and later worked with both creators of the self-consistent field method – Douglas Hartree in Manchester (in 1938) and Vladimir Fock in Leningrad (1949–1951). Adolfas Jucys created the scientific school of theoretical physics in Vilnius, was the head of the Department of Theoretical Physics at Vilnius University (1944–1971). He organized the first Institute of Physics and Mathematics in Lithuania and was its first director (1956–1963), and later (1971–1974) the head of the institute's Department of Quantum Mechanical Calculations.

Jucys developed the theory of the electronic structure of atoms, formulated in a general form the multiconfiguration Hartree–Fock equations taking into account the correlation effects. He along with his co-workers obtained the first solutions of such equations and applied them in atomic structure calculations, later introduced and developed the extended method of calculation, as well as using non-orthogonal radial orbitals.

Adolfas Jucys with his students developed the mathematical apparatus of many-electron atoms with open shells. The most known work in this field is the monograph, in which the original graphical method for the quantities of the angular momentum theory was presented. In particular, Yutsis graphs (connected simple graphs which can be partitioned into two vertex-induced trees) are named after Adolfas Jucys.

Adolfas Jucys had an interest in the representation theory of Lie groups of different rank, but the Jucys–Murphy elements in the group algebra $\mathbb{C} [S_n]$ of the symmetric group are named after his son Algimantas Adolfas Jucys.
