= Table of simple cubic graphs =

Constructs with triply-connected vertices

The connected 3-regular (cubic) simple graphs are listed for small vertex numbers.

== Connectivity ==
The number of connected simple cubic graphs on 4, 6, 8, 10, ... vertices is 1, 2, 5, 19, ... (sequence A002851 in the OEIS). A classification according to edge connectivity is made as follows: the 1-connected and 2-connected graphs are defined as usual. This leaves the other graphs in the 3-connected class because each 3-regular graph can be split by cutting all edges adjacent to any of the vertices. To refine this definition in the light of the algebra of coupling of angular momenta (see below), a subdivision of the 3-connected graphs is helpful. We shall call

- Non-trivially 3-connected those that can be split by 3 edge cuts into sub-graphs with at least two vertices remaining in each part
- Cyclically 4-connected—all those not 1-connected, not 2-connected, and not non-trivially 3-connected

This declares the numbers 3 and 4 in the fourth column of the tables below.

== Pictures ==
Ball-and-stick models of the graphs in another column of the table show the vertices and edges in the style of images of molecular bonds. Comments on the individual pictures contain girth, diameter, Wiener index, Estrada index and Kirchhoff index. Aut is the order of the Automorphism group of the graph. A Hamiltonian circuit (where present) is indicated by enumerating vertices along that path from 1 upwards. (The positions of the vertices have been defined by minimizing a pair potential defined by the squared difference of the Euclidean and graph theoretic distance, placed in a Molfile, then rendered by Jmol.)

== LCF notation ==
The LCF notation is a notation by Joshua Lederberg, Coxeter and Frucht, for the representation of cubic graphs that are Hamiltonian.

The two edges along the cycle adjacent to any of the vertices are not written down.

Let v be the vertices of the graph and describe the Hamiltonian circle along the p vertices by the edge sequence v_{0}v_{1}, v_{1}v_{2}, ...,v_{p−2}v_{p−1}, v_{p−1}v_{0}. Halting at a vertex v_{i}, there is one unique vertex v_{j} at a distance d_{i} joined by a chord with v_{i},

$$j=i+d_i\quad (\bmod\, p),\quad 2\le d_i\le p-2.$$

The vector [d_{0}, d_{1}, ..., d_{p−1}] of the p integers is a suitable, although not unique, representation of the cubic Hamiltonian graph. This is augmented by two additional rules:

1. If a d_{i} > p/2, replace it by d_{i} − p;
2. avoid repetition of a sequence of d_{i} if these are periodic and replace them by an exponential notation.

Since the starting vertex of the path is of no importance, the numbers in the representation may be cyclically permuted. If a graph contains different Hamiltonian circuits, one may select one of these to accommodate the notation. The same graph may have different LCF notations, depending on precisely how the vertices are arranged.

Often the anti-palindromic representations with

$$d_{p-1-i}= -d_i \quad (\bmod\,p), \quad i=0,1,\ldots p/2-1$$

are preferred (if they exist), and the redundant part is then replaced by a semicolon and a dash "; –". The LCF notation [5, −9, 7, −7, 9, −5]^{4}, for example, and would at that stage be condensed to [5, −9, 7; –]^{4}.

== Table ==
=== 4 vertices ===
diam.	girth	Aut.	connect.	LCF	names	picture
1	3	24	4	[2]^{4}	K_{4}	4 vertices and 6 edges. Yutsis graph of the 6-j symbol

=== 6 vertices ===
diam.	girth	Aut.	connect.	LCF	names	picture
2	3	12	3	[2, 3, −2]^{2}	prism graph Y_{3}	6 vertices and 9 edges
2	4	72	4	[3]^{6}	K_{3, 3}, utility graph	6 vertices and 9 edges. Yutsis graph of the 9-j symbol.

=== 8 vertices ===
diam.	girth	Aut.	connect.	LCF	names	pictures
3	3	16	2	[2, 2, −2, −2]^{2}		8 vertices and 12 edges
3	3	4	3	[4, −2, 4, 2]^{2} or [2, 3, −2, 3; –]		8 vertices and 12 edges
2	3	12	3	[2, 4, −2, 3, 3, 4, −3, −3]		8 vertices and 12 edges
3	4	48	4	[−3, 3]^{4}	cube graph	8 vertices and 12 edges. Yutsis graph of the 12j-symbol of the second kind.
2	4	16	4	[4]^{8} or [4, −3, 3, 4]^{2}	Wagner graph	8 vertices and 12 edges. Yutsis graph of the 12j-symbol of the first kind.

=== 10 vertices ===
diam.	girth	Aut.	connect.	LCF	names	pictures
5	3	32	1		Edge list 0–1, 0–6, 0–9, 1–2, 1–5, 2–3, 2–4, 3–4, 3–5, 4–5, 6–7, 6–8, 7–8, 7–9, 8–9	10 vertices and 15 edges
4	3	4	2	[4, 2, 3, −2, −4, −3, 2, 2, −2, −2]		
3	3	8	2	[2, −3, −2, 2, 2; –]		
3	3	16	2	[−2, −2, 3, 3, 3; –]		
4	3	16	2	[2, 2, −2, −2, 5]^{2}		
3	3	2	3	[2, 3, −2, 5, −3]^{2} [3, −2, 4, −3, 4, 2, −4, −2, −4, 2]		
3	3	12	3	[2, −4, −2, 5, 2, 4, −2, 4, 5, −4]		10 vertices and 15 edges
3	3	2	3	[5, 3, 5, −4, −3, 5, 2, 5, −2, 4] [−4, 2, 5, −2, 4, 4, 4, 5, −4, −4] [−3, 2, 4, −2, 4, 4, −4, 3, −4, −4]		10 vertices and 15 edges
3	3	4	3	[−4, 3, 3, 5, −3, −3, 4, 2, 5, −2] [3, −4, −3, −3, 2, 3, −2, 4, −3, 3]		
3	3	6	3	[3, −3, 5, −3, 2, 4, −2, 5, 3, −4]		
3	3	4	3	[2, 3, −2, 3, −3; –] [−4, 4, 2, 5, −2]^{2}		
3	3	6	3	[5, −2, 2, 4, −2, 5, 2, −4, −2, 2]		
3	3	8	3	[2, 5, −2, 5, 5]^{2} [2, 4, −2, 3, 4; –]		10 vertices and 15 edges
3	4	48	3	[5, −3, −3, 3, 3]^{2}		
3	4	8	4	[5, −4, 4, −4, 4]^{2} [5, −4, −3, 3, 4, 5, −3, 4, −4, 3]		Yutsis graph of the 15j-symbol of the third kind.
3	4	4	4	[5, −4, 4, 5, 5]^{2} [−3, 4, −3, 3, 4; –] [4, −3, 4, 4, −4; –] [−4, 3, 5, 5, −3, 4, 4, 5, 5, −4]		Yutsis graph of the 15j-symbol of the fourth kind.
3	4	20	4	[5]^{10} [−3, 3]^{5} [5, 5, −3, 5, 3]^{2}		Yutsis graph of the 15j-symbol of the first kind.
3	4	20	4	[−4, 4, −3, 5, 3]^{2}	Pentagonal prism, G_{5, 2}	Yutsis graph of the 15j-symbol of the second kind.
2	5	120	4		Petersen graph	Yutsis graph of the 15j-symbol of the fifth kind.

=== 12 vertices ===
diam.	girth	Aut.	connect.	LCF	names	picture
6	3	16	1		Edge list 0–1, 0–2, 0–11, 1–2, 1–6, 2–3, 3–4, 3–5, 4–5, 4–6, 5–6, 7–8, 7–9, 7–11, 8–9, 8–10, 9–10, 10–11	
5	3	16	1		Edge list 0–1, 0–6, 0–11, 1–2, 1–3, 2–3, 2–5, 3–4, 4–5, 4–6, 5–6, 7–8, 7–9, 7–11, 8–9, 8–10, 9–10, 10–11	
6	3	8	1		Edge list 0–1, 0–3, 0–11, 1–2, 1–6, 2–3, 2–5, 3–4, 4–5, 4–6, 5–6, 7–8, 7–9, 7–11, 8–9, 8–10, 9–10, 10–11	
5	3	32	1		Edge list 0–1, 0–6, 0–11, 1–2, 1–4, 2–3, 2–5, 3–4, 3–6, 4–5, 5–6, 7–8, 7–9, 7–11, 8–9, 8–10, 9–10, 10–11	
5	3	4	2	[3, −2, −4, −3, 4, 2]^{2} [4, 2, 3, −2, −4, −3; –]		
4	3	8	2	[3, −2, −4, −3, 3, 3, 3, −3, −3, −3, 4, 2]		
4	3	4	2	[4, 2, 3, −2, −4, −3, 2, 3, −2, 2, −3, −2]		
4	4	64	2	[3, 3, 3, −3, −3, −3]^{2}		
4	3	16	2	[2, −3, −2, 3, 3, 3; –]		
4	3	16	2	[2, 3, −2, 2, −3, −2]^{2}		
4	3	2	2	[−2, 3, 6, 3, −3, 2, −3, −2, 6, 2, 2, −2] [4, 2, −4, −2, −4, 6, 2, 2, −2, −2, 4, 6]		
4	3	8	2	[6, 3, 3, 4, −3, −3, 6, −4, 2, 2, −2, −2]		
5	3	4	2	[4, 2, 3, −2, −4, −3, 5, 2, 2, −2, −2, −5]		
4	3	16	2	[−3, −3, −3, 5, 2, 2; –]		
4	3	8	2	[2, −3, −2, 5, 2, 2; –]		
4	3	4	2	[2, 4, −2, 3, −5, −4, −3, 2, 2, −2, −2, 5] [5, 2, −4, −2, −5, −5, 2, 2, −2, −2, 4, 5]		
4	3	4	2	[−2, −2, 4, 4, 4, 4; –] [3, −4, −4, −3, 2, 2; –] [5, 3, 4, 4, −3, −5, −4, −4, 2, 2, −2, −2]		
4	3	2	2	[4, −2, 4, 2, −4, −2, −4, 2, 2, −2, −2, 2] [5, −2, 2, 3, −2, −5, −3, 2, 2, −2, −2, 2]		
5	3	16	2	[2, 2, −2, −2, −5, 5]^{2}		
4	3	8	2	[−2, −2, 4, 5, 3, 4; –]		
4	3	4	2	[5, 2, −3, −2, 6, −5, 2, 2, −2, −2, 6, 3]		
4	3	8	2	[4, −2, 3, 3, −4, −3, −3, 2, 2, −2, −2, 2]		
4	3	8	2	[−2, −2, 5, 3, 5, 3; –] [−2, −2, 3, 5, 3, −3; –]		
5	3	32	2	[2, 2, −2, −2, 6, 6]^{2}		
4	3	8	2	[−3, 2, −3, −2, 2, 2; –]		
4	3	8	2	[−2, −2, 5, 2, 5, −2; –]		
4	3	8	2	[6, −2, 2, 2, −2, −2, 6, 2, 2, −2, −2, 2]		
4	3	48	2	[−2, −2, 2, 2]^{3}		
4	3	4	3	[2, 3, −2, 3, −3, 3; –] [−4, 6, 4, 2, 6, −2]^{2}		
4	3	4	3	[−4, 6, 3, 3, 6, −3, −3, 6, 4, 2, 6, −2] [−2, 3, −3, 4, −3, 3, 3, −4, −3, −3, 2, 3]		
4	3	1	3	[−5, 2, −3, −2, 6, 4, 2, 5, −2, −4, 6, 3] [−2, 3, −3, 4, −3, 4, 2, −4, −2, −4, 2, 3] [3, −2, 3, −3, 5, −3, 2, 3, −2, −5, −3, 2]		
3	3	4	3	[−5, −5, 4, 2, 6, −2, −4, 5, 5, 2, 6, −2] [4, −2, 3, 4, −4, −3, 3, −4, 2, −3, −2, 2]		
3	3	8	3	[−5, −5, 3, 3, 6, −3, −3, 5, 5, 2, 6, −2] [2, 4, −2, 3, 5, −4, −3, 3, 3, −5, −3, −3]		
4	3	2	3	[2, 4, −2, 3, 6, −4, −3, 2, 3, −2, 6, −3] [2, 4, −2, 3, 5, −4, −3, 4, 2, −5, −2, −4] [−5, 2, −3, −2, 5, 5, 2, 5, −2, −5, −5, 3]		
4	3	2	3	[−5, 2, −3, −2, 6, 3, 3, 5, −3, −3, 6, 3] [4, −2, −4, 4, −4, 3, 3, −4, −3, −3, 4, 2] [−3, 3, 3, 4, −3, −3, 5, −4, 2, 3, −2, −5]		
4	3	2	3	[2, 3, −2, 4, −3, 6, 3, −4, 2, −3, −2, 6] [−4, 5, −4, 2, 3, −2, −5, −3, 4, 2, 4, −2]		
4	3	1	3	[6, 3, −4, −4, −3, 3, 6, 2, −3, −2, 4, 4] [−5, −4, 4, 2, 6, −2, −4, 5, 3, 4, 6, −3] [3, 4, 4, −3, 4, −4, −4, 3, −4, 2, −3, −2] [4, 5, −4, −4, −4, 3, −5, 2, −3, −2, 4, 4] [4, 5, −3, −5, −4, 3, −5, 2, −3, −2, 5, 3]		
3	4	4	3	[4, 6, −4, −4, −4, 3, 3, 6, −3, −3, 4, 4] [−5, −4, 3, 3, 6, −3, −3, 5, 3, 4, 6, −3] [4, −3, 5, −4, −4, 3, 3, −5, −3, −3, 3, 4]		
3	4	16	3	[3, 3, 4, −3, −3, 4; –] [3, 6, −3, −3, 6, 3]^{2}		
4	3	1	3	[4, −2, 5, 2, −4, −2, 3, −5, 2, −3, −2, 2] [5, −2, 2, 4, −2, −5, 3, −4, 2, −3, −2, 2] [2, −5, −2, −4, 2, 5, −2, 2, 5, −2, −5, 4]	Frucht graph	
4	3	4	3	[−2, 6, 2, −4, −2, 3, 3, 6, −3, −3, 2, 4] [−2, 2, 5, −2, −5, 3, 3, −5, −3, −3, 2, 5]		
4	3	2	3	[2, 4, −2, 6, 2, −4, −2, 4, 2, 6, −2, −4] [2, 5, −2, 2, 6, −2, −5, 2, 3, −2, 6, −3]		
4	3	2	3	[6, 3, −3, −5, −3, 3, 6, 2, −3, −2, 5, 3] [3, 5, 3, −3, 4, −3, −5, 3, −4, 2, −3, −2] [−5, −3, 4, 2, 5, −2, −4, 5, 3, −5, 3, −3]		
4	4	12	3	[3, −3, 5, −3, −5, 3, 3, −5, −3, −3, 3, 5]		
4	3	2	3	[4, 2, 4, −2, −4, 4; –] [3, 5, 2, −3, −2, 5; –] [6, 2, −3, −2, 6, 3]^{2}		
4	3	2	3	[3, 6, 4, −3, 6, 3, −4, 6, −3, 2, 6, −2] [4, −4, 5, 3, −4, 6, −3, −5, 2, 4, −2, 6] [−5, 5, 3, −5, 4, −3, −5, 5, −4, 2, 5, −2]		
3	3	1	3	[6, −5, 2, 6, −2, 6, 6, 3, 5, 6, −3, 6] [6, 2, −5, −2, 4, 6, 6, 3, −4, 5, −3, 6] [5, 5, 6, 4, 6, −5, −5, −4, 6, 2, 6, −2] [−4, 4, −3, 3, 6, −4, −3, 2, 4, −2, 6, 3] [6, 2, −4, −2, 4, 4, 6, 4, −4, −4, 4, −4] [−3, 2, 5, −2, −5, 3, 4, −5, −3, 3, −4, 5] [−5, 2, −4, −2, 4, 4, 5, 5, −4, −4, 4, −5]		
3	3	2	3	[2, 6, −2, 5, 6, 4, 5, 6, −5, −4, 6, −5] [5, 6, −4, −4, 5, −5, 2, 6, −2, −5, 4, 4] [2, 4, −2, −5, 4, −4, 3, 4, −4, −3, 5, −4] [2, −5, −2, 4, −5, 4, 4, −4, 5, −4, −4, 5]		
4	3	4	3	[2, 4, −2, −5, 5]^{2} [−5, 2, 4, −2, 6, 3, −4, 5, −3, 2, 6, −2]		
4	3	2	3	[−4, −4, 4, 2, 6, −2, −4, 4, 4, 4, 6, −4] [−4, −3, 4, 2, 5, −2, −4, 4, 4, −5, 3, −4] [−3, 5, 3, 4, −5, −3, −5, −4, 2, 3, −2, 5]		
3	3	2	3	[2, 5, −2, 4, 4, 5; –] [2, 4, −2, 4, 4, −4; –] [−5, 5, 6, 2, 6, −2]^{2} [5, −2, 4, 6, 3, −5, −4, −3, 2, 6, −2, 2]		
3	3	2	3	[3, 6, −4, −3, 5, 6, 2, 6, −2, −5, 4, 6] [2, −5, −2, 4, 5, 6, 4, −4, 5, −5, −4, 6] [5, −4, 4, −4, 3, −5, −4, −3, 2, 4, −2, 4]		
4	3	2	3	[6, −5, 2, 4, −2, 5, 6, −4, 5, 2, −5, −2] [−2, 4, 5, 6, −5, −4, 2, −5, −2, 6, 2, 5] [5, −2, 4, −5, 4, −5, −4, 2, −4, −2, 5, 2]		
4	3	1	3	[2, −5, −2, 6, 3, 6, 4, −3, 5, 6, −4, 6] [6, 3, −3, 4, −3, 4, 6, −4, 2, −4, −2, 3] [5, −4, 6, −4, 2, −5, −2, 3, 6, 4, −3, 4] [5, −3, 5, 6, 2, −5, −2, −5, 3, 6, 3, −3] [−5, 2, −5, −2, 6, 3, 5, 5, −3, 5, 6, −5] [−3, 4, 5, −5, −5, −4, 2, −5, −2, 3, 5, 5] [5, 5, 5, −5, 4, −5, −5, −5, −4, 2, 5, −2]		
3	3	2	3	[5, −3, 6, 3, −5, −5, −3, 2, 6, −2, 3, 5] [2, 6, −2, −5, 5, 3, 5, 6, −3, −5, 5, −5] [5, 5, 5, 6, −5, −5, −5, −5, 2, 6, −2, 5] [4, −3, 5, 2, −4, −2, 3, −5, 3, −3, 3, −3] [5, 5, −3, −5, 4, −5, −5, 2, −4, −2, 5, 3]		
4	3	4	3	[2, 4, −2, 5, 3, −4; –] [5, −3, 2, 5, −2, −5; –] [3, 6, 3, −3, 6, −3, 2, 6, −2, 2, 6, −2]		
4	3	2	3	[6, 2, −4, −2, −5, 3, 6, 2, −3, −2, 4, 5] [2, 3, −2, 4, −3, 4, 5, −4, 2, −4, −2, −5] [−5, 2, −4, −2, −5, 4, 2, 5, −2, −4, 4, 5]		
3	3	2	3	[5, 2, 5, −2, 5, −5; –] [6, 2, −4, −2, 4, 6]^{2} [2, −5, −2, 6, 2, 6, −2, 3, 5, 6, −3, 6] [−5, −2, 6, 6, 2, 5, −2, 5, 6, 6, −5, 2]		
3	3	12	3	[−5, 3, 3, 5, −3, −3, 4, 5, −5, 2, −4, −2]		
3	3	2	3	[6, −4, 3, 4, −5, −3, 6, −4, 2, 4, −2, 5] [−4, 6, −4, 2, 5, −2, 5, 6, 4, −5, 4, −5] [5, −5, 4, −5, 3, −5, −4, −3, 5, 2, 5, −2]		
4	3	12	3	[−4, 5, 2, −4, −2, 5; –]	Dürer graph	
3	3	4	3	[2, 5, −2, 5, 3, 5; –] [6, −2, 6, 6, 6, 2]^{2} [5, −2, 6, 6, 2, −5, −2, 3, 6, 6, −3, 2]		
3	3	4	3	[6, −2, 6, 4, 6, 4, 6, −4, 6, −4, 6, 2] [5, 6, −3, 3, 5, −5, −3, 6, 2, −5, −2, 3]		
3	3	4	3	[4, −2, 4, 6, −4, 2, −4, −2, 2, 6, −2, 2] [5, −2, 5, 6, 2, −5, −2, −5, 2, 6, −2, 2]		
3	3	24	3	[6, −2, 2]^{4}	Truncated tetrahedron	
3	3	12	3		Tietze's Graph	
3	3	36	3	[2, 6, −2, 6]^{3}		
4	4	24	4	[−3, 3]^{6} [3, −5, 5, −3, −5, 5]^{2}	G_{6, 2}, Y_{6}	Yutsis 18j-symbol label: B
3	4	4	4	[6, −3, 6, 6, 3, 6]^{2} [6, 6, −5, 5, 6, 6]^{2} [3, −3, 4, −3, 3, 4; –] [5, −3, 6, 6, 3, −5]^{2} [5, −3, −5, 4, 4, −5; –] [6, 6, −3, −5, 4, 4, 6, 6, −4, −4, 5, 3]		Yutsis 18j-symbol label: L
3	4	8	4	[−4, 4, 4, 6, 6, −4]^{2} [6, −5, 5, −5, 5, 6]^{2} [4, −3, 3, 5, −4, −3; –] [−4, −4, 4, 4, −5, 5]^{2}		Yutsis 18j-symbol label: K
3	4	2	4	[−4, 6, 3, 6, 6, −3, 5, 6, 4, 6, 6, −5] [−5, 4, 6, 6, 6, −4, 5, 5, 6, 6, 6, −5] [5, −3, 4, 6, 3, −5, −4, −3, 3, 6, 3, −3] [4, −4, 6, 4, −4, 5, 5, −4, 6, 4, −5, −5] [4, −5, −3, 4, −4, 5, 3, −4, 5, −3, −5, 3]		Yutsis 18j-symbol label: T
3	4	2	4	[3, 4, 5, −3, 5, −4; –] [3, 6, −4, −3, 4, 6]^{2} [−4, 5, 5, −4, 5, 5; –] [3, 6, −4, −3, 4, 4, 5, 6, −4, −4, 4, −5] [4, −5, 5, 6, −4, 5, 5, −5, 5, 6, −5, −5] [4, −4, 5, −4, −4, 3, 4, −5, −3, 4, −4, 4]		Yutsis 18j-symbol label: R
3	4	8	4	[4, −4, 6]^{4} [3, 6, 3, −3, 6, −3]^{2} [−3, 6, 4, −4, 6, 3, −4, 6, −3, 3, 6, 4]	Bidiakis cube	Yutsis 18j-symbol label: D
3	4	16	4	[6, −5, 5]^{4} [3, 4, −4, −3, 4, −4]^{2}		Yutsis 18j-symbol label: G
3	4	2	4	[−3, 5, −3, 4, 4, 5; –] [4, −5, 5, 6, −4, 6]^{2} [−3, 4, −3, 4, 4, −4; –] [5, 6, −3, −5, 4, −5, 3, 6, −4, −3, 5, 3] [5, 6, 4, −5, 5, −5, −4, 6, 3, −5, 5, −3]		Yutsis 18j-symbol label: S
3	4	4	4	[4, −3, 4, 5, −4, 4; –] [4, 5, −5, 5, −4, 5; –] [−5, −3, 4, 5, −5, 4; –]		Yutsis 18j-symbol label: N
3	4	2	4	[6, −4, 6, −4, 3, 5, 6, −3, 6, 4, −5, 4] [6, −4, 3, −4, 4, −3, 6, 3, −4, 4, −3, 4] [5, 6, −4, 3, 5, −5, −3, 6, 3, −5, 4, −3] [5, −5, 4, 6, −5, −5, −4, 3, 5, 6, −3, 5] [5, 5, −4, 4, 5, −5, −5, −4, 3, −5, 4, −3]		Yutsis 18j-symbol label: V
3	4	4	4	[6, −3, 5, 6, −5, 3, 6, −5, −3, 6, 3, 5] [3, −4, 5, −3, 4, 6, 4, −5, −4, 4, −4, 6]		Yutsis 18j-symbol label: P
3	4	8	4	[5, 6, 6, −4, 5, −5, 4, 6, 6, −5, −4, 4]		Yutsis 18j-symbol label: I
3	5	16	4	[4, −5, 4, −5, −4, 4; –]		Yutsis 18j-symbol label: F
3	4	4	4	[6, 4, 6, 6, 6, −4]^{2} [−3, 4, −3, 5, 3, −4; –] [−5, 3, 6, 6, −3, 5, 5, 5, 6, 6, −5, −5] [−3, 3, 6, 4, −3, 5, 5, −4, 6, 3, −5, −5]		Yutsis 18j-symbol label: M
4	4	8	4	[3, 5, 5, −3, 5, 5; –] [−3, 5, −3, 5, 3, 5; –] [5, −3, 5, 5, 5, −5; –]		Yutsis 18j-symbol label: E
3	4	48	4	[5, −5, −3, 3]^{3} [−5, 5]^{6}	Franklin graph	Yutsis 18j-symbol label: C
3	4	24	4	[6]^{12} [6, 6, −3, −5, 5, 3]^{2}		Yutsis 18j-symbol label: A
3	5	18	4	[6, −5, −4, 4, −5, 4, 6, −4, 5, −4, 4, 5]		Yutsis 18j-symbol label: H

The LCF entries are absent above if the graph has no Hamiltonian cycle, which is rare (see Tait's conjecture). In this case a list of edges between pairs of vertices labeled 0 to n−1 in the third column serves as an identifier.

== Vector coupling coefficients ==
Each 4-connected (in the above sense) simple cubic graph on 2n vertices defines a class of quantum mechanical 3n-j symbols. Roughly speaking, each vertex represents a 3-jm symbol, the graph is converted to a digraph by assigning signs to the angular momentum quantum numbers j, the vertices are labelled with a handedness representing the order of the three j (of the three edges) in the 3-jm symbol, and the graph represents a sum over the product of all these numbers assigned to the vertices.

There are 1 (6-j), 1 (9-j), 2 (12-j), 5 (15-j), 18 (18-j), 84 (21-j), 607 (24-j), 6100 (27-j), 78824 (30-j), 1195280 (33-j), 20297600 (36-j), 376940415 (39-j) etc. of these (sequence A175847 in the OEIS).

If they are equivalent to certain vertex-induced binary trees (cutting one edge and finding a cut that splits the remaining graph into two trees), they are representations of recoupling coefficients, and are then also known as Yutsis graphs (sequence A111916 in the OEIS).

== See also ==
- 3-jm symbol
- 6-j symbol
