= Racah W-coefficient =

Racah's W-coefficients were introduced by Giulio Racah in 1942. These coefficients have a purely mathematical definition. In physics they are used in calculations involving the quantum mechanical description of angular momentum, for example in atomic theory.

The coefficients appear when there are three sources of angular momentum in the problem. For example, consider an atom with one electron in an s orbital and one electron in a p orbital. Each electron has electron spin angular momentum and in addition the p orbital has orbital angular momentum (an s orbital has zero orbital angular momentum). The atom may be described by LS coupling or by jj coupling as explained in the article on angular momentum coupling. The transformation between the wave functions that correspond to these two couplings involves a Racah W-coefficient.

Apart from a phase factor, Racah's W-coefficients are equal to Wigner's 6-j symbols, so any equation involving Racah's W-coefficients may be rewritten using 6-j symbols. This is often advantageous because the symmetry properties of 6-j symbols are easier to remember.

Angular momenta in the Racah W coefficients. The top is a 2d plane projection as a quadrilateral, the bottom is a 3d tetrahedral arrangement.

Racah coefficients are related to recoupling coefficients by

$$W(j_1j_2Jj_3;J_{12}J_{23}) \equiv \frac{\langle (j_1, (j_2j_3)J_{23}) J | ((j_1j_2)J_{12},j_3)J \rangle}{\sqrt{(2J_{12}+1)(2J_{23}+1)}}.$$

Recoupling coefficients are elements of a unitary transformation and their definition is given in the next section. Racah coefficients have more convenient symmetry properties than the recoupling coefficients (but less convenient than the 6-j symbols).

== Recoupling coefficients ==
Coupling of two angular momenta $\mathbf{j}_1$ and $\mathbf{j}_2$ is the construction of simultaneous eigenfunctions of $\mathbf{J}^2$ and $J_z$, where $\mathbf{J}=\mathbf{j}_1+\mathbf{j}_2$, as explained in the article on Clebsch–Gordan coefficients. The result is

$$|(j_1j_2)JM\rangle = \sum_{m_1=-j_1}^{j_1} \sum_{m_2=-j_2}^{j_2}
|j_1m_1\rangle |j_2m_2\rangle \langle j_1m_1j_2m_2|JM\rangle,$$

where $J=|j_1-j_2|,\ldots,j_1+j_2$ and $M=-J,\ldots,J$.

Coupling of three angular momenta $\mathbf{j}_1$, $\mathbf{j}_2$, and $\mathbf{j}_3$, may be done by first coupling $\mathbf{j}_1$ and $\mathbf{j}_2$ to $\mathbf{J}_{12}$ and next coupling $\mathbf{J}_{12}$ and $\mathbf{j}_3$ to total angular momentum $\mathbf{J}$:

$$|((j_1j_2)J_{12}j_3)JM\rangle = \sum_{M_{12}=-J_{12}}^{J_{12}} \sum_{m_3=-j_3}^{j_3}
|(j_1j_2)J_{12}M_{12}\rangle |j_3m_3\rangle \langle J_{12}M_{12}j_3m_3|JM\rangle$$

Alternatively, one may first couple $\mathbf{j}_2$ and $\mathbf{j}_3$ to $\mathbf{J}_{23}$ and next couple $\mathbf{j}_1$ and $\mathbf{J}_{23}$ to $\mathbf{J}$:

$$|(j_1,(j_2j_3)J_{23})JM \rangle = \sum_{m_1=-j_1}^{j_1} \sum_{M_{23}=-J_{23}}^{J_{23}}
|j_1m_1\rangle |(j_2j_3)J_{23}M_{23}\rangle \langle j_1m_1J_{23}M_{23}|JM\rangle$$

Both coupling schemes result in complete orthonormal bases for the $(2j_1+1)(2j_2+1)(2j_3+1)$ dimensional space spanned by

$$|j_1 m_1\rangle |j_2 m_2\rangle |j_3 m_3\rangle, \;\;  m_1=-j_1,\ldots,j_1;\;\; m_2=-j_2,\ldots,j_2;\;\; m_3=-j_3,\ldots,j_3.$$

Hence, the two total angular momentum bases are related by a unitary transformation. The matrix elements of this unitary transformation are given by a scalar product and are known as recoupling coefficients. The coefficients are independent of $M$ and so we have

$$|((j_1j_2)J_{12}j_3)JM\rangle = \sum_{J_{23}} |(j_1,(j_2j_3)J_{23})JM \rangle
\langle (j_1,(j_2j_3)J_{23})J |((j_1j_2)J_{12}j_3)J\rangle.$$

The independence of $M$ follows readily by writing this equation for $M=J$ and applying the lowering operator $J_-$ to both sides of the equation. The definition of Racah W-coefficients lets us write this final expression as

$$|((j_1j_2)J_{12}j_3)JM\rangle = \sum_{J_{23}} |(j_1,(j_2j_3)J_{23})JM \rangle
W(j_1j_2Jj_3; J_{12}J_{23}) \sqrt{(2J_{12}+1)(2J_{23}+1)}.$$

== Algebra ==
Let

$$\Delta(a,b,c)=[(a+b-c)!(a-b+c)!(-a+b+c)!/(a+b+c+1)!]^{1/2}$$

be the usual triangular factor, then the Racah coefficient is a product of four of these by a sum over factorials,

$$W(abcd;ef)=\Delta(a,b,e)\Delta(c,d,e)\Delta(a,c,f)\Delta(b,d,f)w(abcd;ef)$$

where

$$w(abcd;ef)\equiv
\sum_z\frac{(-1)^{z+\beta_1}(z+1)!}{(z-\alpha_1)!(z-\alpha_2)!(z-\alpha_3)!
(z-\alpha_4)!(\beta_1-z)!(\beta_2-z)!(\beta_3-z)!}$$

and

$$\alpha_1=a+b+e;\quad \beta_1=a+b+c+d;$$
$$\alpha_2=c+d+e;\quad \beta_2=a+d+e+f;$$
$$\alpha_3=a+c+f;\quad \beta_3=b+c+e+f;$$
$$\alpha_4=b+d+f.$$

The sum over $z$ is finite over the range

$$\max(\alpha_1,\alpha_2,\alpha_3,\alpha_4) \le z \le \min(\beta_1,\beta_2,\beta_3).$$

== Relation to Wigner's 6-j symbol ==
Racah's W-coefficients are related to Wigner's 6-j symbols, which have even more convenient symmetry properties

$$W(abcd;ef)(-1)^{a+b+c+d}=
\begin{Bmatrix}
a&b&e\\
d&c&f
\end{Bmatrix}.$$

Cf. or

$$W(j_1j_2Jj_3;J_{12}J_{23}) = (-1)^{j_1+j_2+j_3+J}
\begin{Bmatrix}
j_1 & j_2 & J_{12}\\
j_3 & J   & J_{23}
\end{Bmatrix}.$$

== See also ==
- Clebsch–Gordan coefficients
- 3-j symbol
- 6-j symbol
- Pandya theorem
