= Coefficient of fractional parentage =

In physics, coefficients of fractional parentage (cfp's) can be used to obtain anti-symmetric many-body states for like particles. In a jj-coupling scheme they are defined by the following relation.

$$\Psi_{1\ldots N}(j^N\alpha JM)= \sum_{\alpha_1 J_1}
\langle j^{N-1}(\alpha_1 J_1);j J\mid\} j^N \alpha J \rangle
\left[\Psi_{1\ldots N-1}(j^{N-1}\alpha_1 J_1)\otimes
\psi_N(j)\right]^J_M$$

The state $\Psi_{1\ldots N}(j^N\alpha JM)$ is normalized and totally anti-symmetric with respect to permutations of all its N particles, while the state $\Psi_{1\ldots N-1}(j^{N-1}\alpha_1 J_1)$ is normalized and totally anti-symmetric with respect to all its N − 1 particles.
