= Pandya theorem =

Shell calculation tool in nuclear physics

The Pandya theorem is a good illustration of the richness of information forthcoming from a judicious use of subtle symmetry principles connecting vastly different sectors of nuclear systems. It is a tool for calculations regarding both particles and holes.

== Description ==
Pandya theorem provides a theoretical framework for connecting the energy levels in jj coupling of a nucleon-nucleon and nucleon-hole system. It is also referred to as Pandya Transformation or Pandya Relation in literature. It provides a very useful tool for extending shell model calculations across shells, for systems involving both particles and holes.

The Pandya transformation, which involves angular momentum re-coupling coefficients (Racah-Coefficient), can be used to deduce one-particle one-hole (ph) matrix elements. By assuming the wave function to be "pure" (no configuration mixing), Pandya transformation could be used to set an upper bound to the contributions of 3-body forces to the energies of nuclear states.

== History ==
It was first published in 1956 as follows:

Nucleon-Hole Interaction in jj Coupling

S.P. Pandya, Phys. Rev. 103, 956 (1956). Received 9 May 1956

A theorem connecting the energy levels in jj coupling of a nucleon-nucleon and nucleon-hole system is derived, and applied in particular to Cl38 and K40.

== Shell model Monte Carlo approaches to nuclear level densities ==
Since it is by no means obvious how to extract "pairing correlations" from the realistic shell-model calculations, Pandya transform is applied in such cases. The "pairing Hamiltonian" is an integral part of the residual shell-model interaction. The shell-model Hamiltonian is usually written in the p-p representation, but it also can be transformed to the p-h representation by means of the Pandya transformation. This means that the high-J interaction between pairs can translate into the low-J interaction in the p-h channel. It is only in the mean-field theory that the division into "particle-hole" and "particle-particle" channels appears naturally.

== Features ==
Some features of the Pandya transformation are as follows:

1. It relates diagonal and non-diagonal elements.
2. To calculate any particle-hole element, the particle-particle elements for all spins belonging to the orbitals involved are needed; the same holds for the reverse transformation. Because the experimental information is nearly always incomplete, one can only transform from the theoretical particle-particle elements to particle-hole.
3. The Pandya transform does not describe the matrix elements that mix one-particle one-hole and two-particle two-hole states. Therefore, only states of rather pure one-particle one-hole structure can be treated.

Pandya theorem establishes a relation between particle-particle and particle-hole spectra. Here one considers the energy levels of two nucleons with one in orbit j and another in orbit j' and relate them to the energy levels of a nucleon hole in orbit j and a nucleus in j. Assuming pure j-j coupling and two-body interaction, Pandya (1956) derived the following relation:

This was successfully tested in the spectra of

Figure 3 shows the results where the discrepancy between the calculated and observed spectra is less than 25 keV.

== Bibliography ==
- Pandya, Sudhir P. (1956-08-15). "Nucleon-Hole Interaction in jj Coupling". Physical Review. 103 (4). American Physical Society (APS): 956–957. Bibcode:1956PhRv..103..956P. doi:10.1103/physrev.103.956. ISSN 0031-899X.
- Racah, G.; Talmi, I. (1952). "The pairing property of nuclear interactions". Physica. 18 (12). Elsevier BV: 1097–1100. Bibcode:1952Phy....18.1097R. doi:10.1016/s0031-8914(52)80178-8. ISSN 0031-8914.
- Wigner, E. (1937-01-15). "On the Consequences of the Symmetry of the Nuclear Hamiltonian on the Spectroscopy of Nuclei". Physical Review. 51 (2). American Physical Society (APS): 106–119. Bibcode:1937PhRv...51..106W. doi:10.1103/physrev.51.106. ISSN 0031-899X.
