= 9-j symbol =

Symbol used in quantum mechanics

Jucys diagram for the Wigner 9-j symbol. The diagram describes a summation over six 3-jm symbols. Plus signs on each nodes indicate an anticlockwise reading of the lines for the 3-jm symbol, whereas minus signs indicate clockwise. Due to its symmetries, there are many ways in which the diagram can be drawn.

In physics, Wigner's 9-j symbols were introduced by Eugene Wigner in 1937. They are related to recoupling coefficients in quantum mechanics involving four angular momenta:

$\sqrt{(2j_3+1)(2j_6+1)(2j_7+1)(2j_8+1)} \begin{Bmatrix} j_1 & j_2 & j_3\\ j_4 & j_5 & j_6\\ j_7 & j_8 & j_9 \end{Bmatrix}$ $= \langle ( (j_1j_2)j_3,(j_4j_5)j_6)j_9 | ((j_1 j_4)j_7,(j_2j_5)j_8)j_9\rangle.$

== Recoupling of four angular momentum vectors ==
Coupling of two angular momenta $\mathbf{j}_1$ and $\mathbf{j}_2$ is the construction of simultaneous eigenfunctions of $\mathbf{J}^2$ and $J_z$, where $\mathbf{J}=\mathbf{j}_1+\mathbf{j}_2$, as explained in the article on Clebsch–Gordan coefficients.

Coupling of three angular momenta can be done in several ways, as explained in the article on Racah W-coefficients. Using the notation and techniques of that article, total angular momentum states that arise from coupling the angular momentum vectors $\mathbf{j}_1$, $\mathbf{j}_2$, $\mathbf{j}_4$, and $\mathbf{j}_5$ may be written as

$$| ((j_1j_2)j_3, (j_4j_5)j_6)j_9m_9\rangle.$$

Alternatively, one may first couple $\mathbf{j}_1$ and $\mathbf{j}_4$ to $\mathbf{j}_7$ and $\mathbf{j}_2$ and $\mathbf{j}_5$ to $\mathbf{j}_8$, before coupling $\mathbf{j}_7$ and $\mathbf{j}_8$ to $\mathbf{j}_9$:

$$|((j_1j_4)j_7, (j_2j_5)j_8)j_9m_9\rangle.$$

Both sets of functions provide a complete, orthonormal basis for the space with dimension $(2j_1+1)(2j_2+1)(2j_4+1)(2j_5+1)$ spanned by

$$|j_1 m_1\rangle |j_2 m_2\rangle |j_4 m_4\rangle |j_5 m_5\rangle, \;\;
m_1=-j_1,\ldots,j_1;\;\; m_2=-j_2,\ldots,j_2;\;\; m_4=-j_4,\ldots,j_4;\;\;m_5=-j_5,\ldots,j_5.$$

Hence, the transformation between the two sets is unitary and the matrix elements of the transformation are given by the scalar products of the functions. As in the case of the Racah W-coefficients the matrix elements are independent of the total angular momentum projection quantum number ($m_9$):

$$|((j_1j_4)j_7, (j_2j_5)j_8)j_9m_9\rangle = \sum_{j_3}\sum_{j_6}
| ((j_1j_2)j_3, (j_4j_5)j_6)j_9m_9\rangle
\langle ( (j_1j_2)j_3,(j_4j_5)j_6)j_9 | ((j_1 j_4)j_7,(j_2j_5)j_8)j_9\rangle.$$

== Symmetry relations ==
A 9-j symbol is invariant under reflection about either diagonal as well as even permutations of its rows or columns:

$$\begin{Bmatrix}
j_1 & j_2 & j_3\\
j_4 & j_5 & j_6\\
j_7 & j_8 & j_9
\end{Bmatrix}
=
\begin{Bmatrix}
j_1 & j_4 & j_7\\
j_2 & j_5 & j_8\\
j_3 & j_6 & j_9
\end{Bmatrix}
=
\begin{Bmatrix}
j_9 & j_6 & j_3\\
j_8 & j_5 & j_2\\
j_7 & j_4 & j_1
\end{Bmatrix}
=
\begin{Bmatrix}
j_7 & j_4 & j_1\\
j_9 & j_6 & j_3\\
j_8 & j_5 & j_2
\end{Bmatrix}.$$

An odd permutation of rows or columns yields a phase factor $(-1)^S$, where

$$S=\sum_{i=1}^9 j_i.$$

For example:

$$\begin{Bmatrix}
j_1 & j_2 & j_3\\
j_4 & j_5 & j_6\\
j_7 & j_8 & j_9
\end{Bmatrix}
=
(-1)^S
\begin{Bmatrix}
j_4 & j_5 & j_6\\
j_1 & j_2 & j_3\\
j_7 & j_8 & j_9
\end{Bmatrix}
=
(-1)^S
\begin{Bmatrix}
j_2 & j_1 & j_3\\
j_5 & j_4 & j_6\\
j_8 & j_7 & j_9
\end{Bmatrix}.$$

== Reduction to 6j symbols ==
The 9-j symbols can be calculated as sums over triple-products of 6-j symbols where the summation extends over all x admitted by the triangle conditions in the factors:

$$\begin{Bmatrix}
j_1 & j_2 & j_3 \\
j_4 & j_5 & j_6 \\
j_7 & j_8 & j_9
\end{Bmatrix} = \sum_x (-1)^{2 x}(2 x + 1)
\begin{Bmatrix}
j_1 & j_4 & j_7 \\
j_8 & j_9 & x
\end{Bmatrix}
\begin{Bmatrix}
j_2 & j_5 & j_8 \\
j_4 & x & j_6
\end{Bmatrix}
\begin{Bmatrix}
j_3 & j_6 & j_9 \\
x & j_1 & j_2
\end{Bmatrix}$$.

== Special case ==
When $j_9=0$ the 9-j symbol is proportional to a 6-j symbol:

$$\begin{Bmatrix}
j_1 & j_2 & j_3\\
j_4 & j_5 & j_6\\
j_7 & j_8 & 0
\end{Bmatrix}
=
\frac{\delta_{j_3,j_6} \delta_{j_7,j_8}}{\sqrt{(2j_3+1)(2j_7+1)}}
(-1)^{j_2+j_3+j_4+j_7}
\begin{Bmatrix}
j_1 & j_2 & j_3\\
j_5 & j_4 & j_7
\end{Bmatrix}.$$

== Orthogonality relation ==
The 9-j symbols satisfy this orthogonality relation:

$$\sum_{j_7 j_8} (2j_7+1)(2j_8+1)
\begin{Bmatrix}
j_1 & j_2 & j_3\\
j_4 & j_5 & j_6\\
j_7 & j_8 & j_9
\end{Bmatrix}
\begin{Bmatrix}
j_1 & j_2 & j_3'\\
j_4 & j_5 & j_6'\\
j_7 & j_8 & j_9
\end{Bmatrix}
= \frac{\delta_{j_3j_3'}\delta_{j_6j_6'} \begin{Bmatrix} j_1 & j_2 & j_3 \end{Bmatrix} \begin{Bmatrix} j_4 & j_5 & j_6\end{Bmatrix} \begin{Bmatrix} j_3 & j_6 & j_9 \end{Bmatrix}}
{(2j_3+1)(2j_6+1)}.$$

The triangular delta {j_{1} j_{2} j_{3}} is equal to 1 when the triad (j_{1}, j_{2}, j_{3}) satisfies the triangle conditions, and zero otherwise.

== 3n-j symbols ==
The 6-j symbol is the first representative, n = 2, of 3n-j symbols that are defined as sums of products of n of Wigner's 3-jm coefficients. The sums are over all combinations of m that the 3n-j coefficients admit, i.e., which lead to non-vanishing contributions.

If each 3-jm factor is represented by a vertex and each j by an edge, these 3n-j symbols can be mapped on certain 3-regular graphs with 3n edges and 2n nodes. The 6-j symbol is associated with the K_{4} graph on 4 vertices, the 9-j symbol with the utility graph on 6 vertices (K_{3,3}), and the two distinct (non-isomorphic) 12-j symbols with the Q_{3} and Wagner graphs on 8 vertices. Symmetry relations are generally representative of the automorphism group of these graphs.

== See also ==
- Clebsch–Gordan coefficients
- 3-j symbol, also called 3-jm symbol
- Racah W-coefficient
- 6-j symbol
