= Algimantas Adolfas Jucys =

- Born: November 14, 1936; Kaunas
- Died: July 29, 1997 (aged 60); Vilnius

Algimantas Adolfas Jucys (14 November 1936 – 29 July 1997) was a Lithuanian theoretical physicist more prominent as a mathematician, a son of Lithuanian physicist Adolfas Jucys. Since 1967 Algis Jucys was researcher at the Institute of Physics and Mathematics of Lithuanian Academy of Sciences, in 1977-1990 at the Institute of Physics and in 1990-1996 at the Institute of Theoretical Physics and Astronomy, Lithuania.

Algimantas (Algis) Adolfas (A.-A.A.) Jucys was member of Lithuanian Physical Society, Lithuanian Mathematical Society, American Mathematical Society. Jucys–Murphy elements in the group algebra $\mathbb{C} [S_n]$ of the symmetric group are named after him.
