= Jucys–Murphy element =

Elements in representations of the symmetric group

In mathematics, the Jucys–Murphy elements in the group algebra $\mathbb{C} [S_n]$ of the symmetric group, named after Algimantas Adolfas Jucys and G. E. Murphy, are defined as a sum of transpositions by the formula:

$$X_1=0, ~~~  X_k= (1 \; k)+ (2 \; k)+\cdots+(k-1 \; k), ~~~ k=2,\dots,n.$$

They play an important role in the representation theory of the symmetric group.

== Properties ==
They generate a commutative subalgebra of $\mathbb{C} [ S_n]$. Moreover, X_{n} commutes with all elements of $\mathbb{C} [S_{n-1}]$.

The vectors constituting the basis of Young's "seminormal representation" are eigenvectors for the action of X_{n}. For any standard Young tableau U we have:

$$X_k v_U =c_k(U) v_U, ~~~ k=1,\dots,n,$$

where c_{k}(U) is the content b − a of the cell (a, b) occupied by k in the standard Young tableau U.

Theorem (Jucys): The center $Z(\mathbb{C} [S_n])$ of the group algebra $\mathbb{C} [S_n]$ of the symmetric group is generated by the symmetric polynomials in the elements X_{k}.

Theorem (Jucys): Let t be a formal variable commuting with everything, then the following identity for polynomials in variable t with values in the group algebra $\mathbb{C} [S_n]$ holds true:

$$(t+X_1) (t+X_2) \cdots (t+X_n)= \sum_{\sigma \in S_n} \sigma t^{\text{number of cycles of }\sigma}.$$

Theorem (Okounkov–Vershik): The subalgebra of $\mathbb{C} [S_n]$ generated by the centers

$$Z(\mathbb{C} [ S_1]), Z(\mathbb{C} [ S_2]), \ldots,  Z(\mathbb{C} [ S_{n-1}]),  Z(\mathbb{C} [S_n])$$

is exactly the subalgebra generated by the Jucys–Murphy elements X_{k}.

== See also ==
- Representation theory of the symmetric group
- Young symmetrizer
