= Phase factor =

Type of complex number

In physics and representation theory, a phase factor is a multiplier representing the phase of a wave or the phase difference between two quantities. It is formulated as a unit complex number, that is a complex number with absolute value 1. For a complex number written in polar form, such as r e^{iθ}, the phase factor is the complex exponential, e^{iθ}, where the variable θ is the phase and i is the imaginary unit. If a quantity like a scalar, vector, or a matrix (representing a wave, state, or operator) is equal to another quantity times a phase factor, then those two quantities are said to be equivalent up to the phase factor, as it leaves the length (or norm) unchanged. As a set, the possible phase factors form the circle group $U(1)$, but the term often refers to a scalar recording a phase choice or convention, or an ambiguity in choosing a representative.

== Properties ==
For a phase factor $z$, the following hold:
$$z = e^{i\theta} = \cos \theta + i \sin \theta.$$
$$z^*z = 1.$$

== Phase ambiguity ==
Multiplying the equation of a plane wave Ae^{i(k·r − ωt)} by a phase factor e^{iθ} shifts the phase of the wave by θ:
$$e^{i\theta} A\,e^{i({\mathbf{k}\cdot\mathbf{r} - \omega t})} = A\,e^{i({\mathbf{k}\cdot\mathbf{r} - \omega t + \theta})}.$$
This phase factor is related to the arbitrary selection of the origin of the time axis.

In quantum mechanics, a phase factor is a complex coefficient e^{iθ} that multiplies a ket $|\psi\rangle$ or bra $\langle\phi|$. It does not, in itself, have any physical meaning, since the introduction of a phase factor does not change the expectation values of a Hermitian operator; this effect is known as phase ambiguity. That is, the values of $\langle\phi| A |\phi\rangle$ and $\langle\psi| A |\psi\rangle$, where $|\psi\rangle = e^{i\theta}|\phi\rangle$, are the same.

The phase ambiguity may also be described as a flexibility in the definition of quantum state functions. For example, the eigenfunctions of the angular momentum operator are uniquely defined "except for a phase factor".

In defining spherical harmonics for use in quantum mechanics, the phase factor may be selected to have a standard value initially selected by Edward Condon and G.H. Shortley. For example, this convention is used for the Clebsch–Gordan coefficients.

== Phase differences ==
Differences in phase factors between two interacting quantum states can sometimes be measurable, such as in the Berry phase, and the Aharonov-Bohm effect. In optics, the phase factor is an important quantity in the treatment of interference.

== Projective representations and lifts ==
Phase factors can appear when a mathematical or physical object is determined only up to the choice of a representative. As noted above, in quantum mechanics, pure states are represented by rays in Hilbert space rather than by individual normalized vectors. Thus the physical states are normalized vectors up to a phase factor. Likewise, a symmetry of the ray space may be represented on Hilbert space by a unitary operator, but such an operator is determined only up to multiplication by a phase factor. Consequently, a symmetry group may act by operators satisfying
$$U(g)U(h) = \omega(g,h)U(gh),$$
where $\omega(g,h)$ is a phase factor. Such an action is a projective representation.

A related ambiguity occurs in the representation theory of the Heisenberg group. Because of the Stone–von Neumann theorem, an automorphism of the underlying position-momentum space gives a unitary operator of the oscillator representation, but only up to a phase factor. The resulting operators therefore define a projective representation of the symplectic group. Passing to the metaplectic group resolves this ambiguity.

== See also ==
- Berry phase
- Bra-ket notation
- Euler's formula
- Phasor
- Plane wave
- The circle group U(1)
