= 6-j symbol =

Sums in quantum mathematics

Jucys diagram for the Wigner 6-j symbol. The plus sign on the nodes indicates an anticlockwise reading of its surrounding lines. Due to its symmetries, there are many ways in which the diagram can be drawn. An equivalent configuration can be created by taking its mirror image and thus changing the pluses to minuses.

Wigner's 6-j symbols were introduced by Eugene Paul Wigner in 1940 and published in 1965. They are defined as a sum over products of four Wigner 3-j symbols,

$$\begin{align}
\begin{Bmatrix}
j_1 & j_2 & j_3\\
j_4 & j_5 & j_6
\end{Bmatrix}
&= \sum_{m_1, \dots, m_6} (-1)^{\sum_{k = 1}^6 (j_k - m_k)}
\begin{pmatrix}
j_1 & j_2 & j_3\\
-m_1 & -m_2 & -m_3
\end{pmatrix}\times\\
&\times
\begin{pmatrix}
j_1 & j_5 & j_6\\
m_1 & -m_5 & m_6
\end{pmatrix}
\begin{pmatrix}
j_4 & j_2 & j_6\\
m_4 & m_2 & -m_6
\end{pmatrix}
\begin{pmatrix}
j_4 & j_5 & j_3\\
-m_4 & m_5 & m_3
\end{pmatrix}
.
\end{align}$$

The summation is over all six m_{i} allowed by the selection rules of the 3-j symbols.

They are closely related to the Racah W-coefficients, which are used for recoupling 3 angular momenta, although Wigner 6-j symbols have higher symmetry and therefore provide a more efficient means of storing the recoupling coefficients. Their relationship is given by:

$$\begin{Bmatrix}
j_1 & j_2 & j_3\\
j_4 & j_5 & j_6
\end{Bmatrix}
= (-1)^{j_1 + j_2 + j_4 + j_5} W(j_1 j_2 j_5 j_4; j_3 j_6).$$

== Symmetry relations ==
The 6-j symbol is invariant under any permutation of the columns:

$$\begin{Bmatrix}
j_1 & j_2 & j_3\\
j_4 & j_5 & j_6
\end{Bmatrix}
=
\begin{Bmatrix}
j_2 & j_1 & j_3\\
j_5 & j_4 & j_6
\end{Bmatrix}
=
\begin{Bmatrix}
j_1 & j_3 & j_2\\
j_4 & j_6 & j_5
\end{Bmatrix}
=
\begin{Bmatrix}
j_3 & j_2 & j_1\\
j_6 & j_5 & j_4
\end{Bmatrix}
= \cdots$$

The 6-j symbol is also invariant if upper and lower arguments are interchanged in any two columns:

$$\begin{Bmatrix}
j_1 & j_2 & j_3\\
j_4 & j_5 & j_6
\end{Bmatrix}
=
\begin{Bmatrix}
j_4 & j_5 & j_3\\
j_1 & j_2 & j_6
\end{Bmatrix}
=
\begin{Bmatrix}
j_1 & j_5 & j_6\\
j_4 & j_2 & j_3
\end{Bmatrix}
=
\begin{Bmatrix}
j_4 & j_2 & j_6\\
j_1 & j_5 & j_3
\end{Bmatrix}.$$

These equations reflect the 24 symmetry operations of the automorphism group that leave the associated tetrahedral Yutsis graph with 6 edges invariant: mirror operations that exchange two vertices and a swap an adjacent pair of edges.

The 6-j symbol

$$\begin{Bmatrix}
j_1 & j_2 & j_3\\
j_4 & j_5 & j_6
\end{Bmatrix}$$

is zero unless j_{1}, j_{2}, and j_{3} satisfy triangle conditions, i.e.,

$$j_1 = |j_2-j_3|, \ldots, j_2+j_3$$

In combination with the symmetry relation for interchanging upper and lower arguments this shows that triangle conditions must also be satisfied for the triads (j_{1}, j_{5}, j_{6}), (j_{4}, j_{2}, j_{6}), and (j_{4}, j_{5}, j_{3}). Furthermore, the sum of the elements of each triad must be an integer. Therefore, the members of each triad are either all integers or contain one integer and two half-integers.

== Special cases ==
When j_{6} = 0 the expression for the 6-j symbol is:

$$\begin{Bmatrix}
j_1 & j_2 & j_3\\
j_4 & j_5 & 0
\end{Bmatrix}
= \frac{\delta_{j_2,j_4}\delta_{j_1,j_5}}{\sqrt{(2j_1+1)(2j_2+1)}} (-1)^{j_1+j_2+j_3} \begin{Bmatrix} j_1 & j_2 & j_3 \end{Bmatrix}.$$

The triangular delta {j_{1} j_{2} j_{3}} is equal to 1 when the triad (j_{1}, j_{2}, j_{3}) satisfies the triangle conditions, and zero otherwise. The symmetry relations can be used to find the expression when another j is equal to zero.

Values for j_{6} = e = 0, 1/2, 1, 3/2 & 2 can be straightforwardly obtained from the Racah W-coefficients (Brink & Satchler 1994, Table 4, j_{6} = e = 0, 1/2, & 1; Biedenharn, Blatt, & Rose, 1952, j_{6} = e = 0, 1/2, 1, 3/2 & 2. Values for j_{6} = 1/2 and 1 are given below. The formulae for the recouplings for other values of j_{6} can be easily inferred from these by using the symmetry of the 6j-symbols and appropriate substitution.

$$\begin{Bmatrix}
j_1 & j_2 & j_3\\
j_2+\frac{1}{2} & j_1+\frac{1}{2} & \frac{1}{2}
\end{Bmatrix}
= (-1)^{j_1+j_2+j_3+1} \left[ \frac{(j_1 + j_2 + j_3+2)(j_1 + j_2 - j_3+1)}{(2j_1+1)(2j_1+2)(2j_2+1)(2j_2+2)} \right]^{1/2}$$

$$\begin{Bmatrix}
j_1 & j_2 & j_3\\
j_2+\frac{1}{2} & j_1-\frac{1}{2} & \frac{1}{2}
\end{Bmatrix}
= (-1)^{j_1+j_2+j_3} \left[ \frac{(j_3 + j_1 - j_2)(j_2 + j_3 - j_1+1)}{(2j_1)(2j_1+1)(2j_2+1)(2j_2+2)} \right]^{1/2}$$

$$\begin{Bmatrix}
j_1 & j_2 & j_3\\
j_2-1 & j_1-1 & 1
\end{Bmatrix}
= (-1)^{j_1+j_2+j_3} \left[ \frac{(j_1 + j_2 + j_3)(j_1 + j_2 +j_3+1)(j_1+j_2-j_3)(j_1+j_2-j_3-1)}{(2j_1-1)(2j_1)(2j_1+1)(2j_2-1)(2j_2)(2j_2+1)} \right]^{1/2}$$

$$\begin{Bmatrix}
j_1 & j_2 & j_3\\
j_2-1 & j_1 & 1
\end{Bmatrix}
= (-1)^{j_1+j_2+j_3} \left[ \frac{2(j_1 + j_2 + j_3+1)(j_1 + j_2-j_3)(j_2+j_3-j_1)(j_1-j_2+j_3+1)}{(2j_1)(2j_1+1)(2j_1+2)(2j_2-1)(2j_2)(2j_2+1)} \right]^{1/2}$$

$$\begin{Bmatrix}
j_1 & j_2 & j_3\\
j_2+1 & j_1-1 & 1
\end{Bmatrix}
= (-1)^{j_1+j_2+j_3} \left[ \frac{(j_1-j_2+j_3-1)(j_1-j_2+j_3)(j_2+j_3-j_1+1)(j_2+j_3-j_1+2)}{(2j_1-1)(2j_1)(2j_1+1)(2j_2+1)(2j_2+2)(2j_2+3)} \right]^{1/2}$$

$$\begin{Bmatrix}
j_1 & j_2 & j_3\\
j_2 & j_1 & 1
\end{Bmatrix}
= (-1)^{j_1+j_2+j_3+1} \frac{j_1(j_1+1) + j_2(j_2+1) - j_3(j_3+1)}{[(2j_1)(2j_1+1)(2j_1+2)(j_2)(j_2+1)(2j_2+1)]^{1/2}}$$

In practice, rather than using tables of 6j-symbols, one would make use of the available calculators and computer codes listed under External Links below, or, for specific arguments, look them up in a set of tables (Varshalovic, Moskalev, & Khersonskii 1988, Chapter 9).

== Orthogonality relation ==
The 6-j symbols satisfy this orthogonality relation:

$$\sum_{j_3} (2j_3+1)
\begin{Bmatrix}
j_1 & j_2 & j_3\\
j_4 & j_5 & j_6
\end{Bmatrix}
\begin{Bmatrix}
j_1 & j_2 & j_3\\
j_4 & j_5 & j_6'
\end{Bmatrix}
= \frac{\delta_{j_6^{}j_6'}}{2j_6+1} \begin{Bmatrix} j_1 & j_5 & j_6 \end{Bmatrix} \begin{Bmatrix} j_4 & j_2 & j_6 \end{Bmatrix}.$$

== Asymptotics ==
A remarkable formula for the asymptotic behavior of the 6-j symbol was first conjectured by Ponzano and Regge and later proven by Roberts. The asymptotic formula applies when all six quantum numbers j_{1}, ..., j_{6} are taken to be large and associates to the 6-j symbol the geometry of a tetrahedron. If the 6-j symbol is determined by the quantum numbers j_{1}, ..., j_{6} the associated tetrahedron has edge lengths J_{i} = j_{i}+1/2 (i=1,...,6) and the asymptotic formula is given by,

$$\begin{Bmatrix}
j_1 & j_2 & j_3\\
j_4 & j_5 & j_6
\end{Bmatrix}
\sim \frac{1}{\sqrt{12 \pi |V|}} \cos{\left( \sum_{i=1}^{6} J_i \theta_i +\frac{\pi}{4}\right)}.$$

The notation is as follows: Each θ_{i} is the external dihedral angle about the edge J_{i} of the associated tetrahedron and the amplitude factor is expressed in terms of the volume, V, of this tetrahedron.

== Mathematical interpretation ==
In representation theory, 6-j symbols are matrix coefficients of the associator isomorphism in a tensor category. For example, if we are given three representations V_{i}, V_{j}, V_{k} of a group (or quantum group), one has a natural isomorphism

$$(V_i \otimes V_j) \otimes V_k \to V_i \otimes (V_j \otimes V_k)$$

of tensor product representations, induced by coassociativity of the corresponding bialgebra. One of the axioms defining a monoidal category is that associators satisfy a pentagon identity, which is equivalent to the Biedenharn-Elliot identity for 6-j symbols.

When a monoidal category is semisimple, we can restrict our attention to irreducible objects, and define multiplicity spaces

$$H_{i,j}^\ell = \operatorname{Hom}(V_{\ell}, V_i \otimes V_j)$$

so that tensor products are decomposed as:

$$V_i \otimes V_j = \bigoplus_\ell H_{i,j}^\ell \otimes V_\ell$$

where the sum is over all isomorphism classes of irreducible objects. Then:

$$(V_i \otimes V_j) \otimes V_k \cong \bigoplus_{\ell,m} H_{i,j}^\ell \otimes H_{\ell,k}^m \otimes V_m \qquad \text{while} \qquad V_i \otimes (V_j \otimes V_k) \cong \bigoplus_{m,n} H_{i,n}^m \otimes H_{j,k}^n \otimes V_m$$

The associativity isomorphism induces a vector space isomorphism

$$\Phi_{i,j}^{k,m}: \bigoplus_{\ell} H_{i,j}^\ell \otimes H_{\ell,k}^m \to \bigoplus_n H_{i,n}^m \otimes H_{j,k}^n$$

and the 6j symbols are defined as the component maps:

$$\begin{Bmatrix}
i & j & \ell\\
k & m & n
\end{Bmatrix}
= (\Phi_{i,j}^{k,m})_{\ell,n}$$

When the multiplicity spaces have canonical basis elements and dimension at most one (as in the case of SU(2) in the traditional setting), these component maps can be interpreted as numbers, and the 6-j symbols become ordinary matrix coefficients.

In abstract terms, the 6-j symbols are precisely the information that is lost when passing from a semisimple monoidal category to its Grothendieck ring, since one can reconstruct a monoidal structure using the associator. For the case of representations of a finite group, it is well known that the character table alone (which determines the underlying abelian category and the Grothendieck ring structure) does not determine a group up to isomorphism, while the symmetric monoidal category structure does, by Tannaka-Krein duality. In particular, the two nonabelian groups of order 8 have equivalent abelian categories of representations and isomorphic Grothdendieck rings, but the 6-j symbols of their representation categories are distinct, meaning their representation categories are inequivalent as monoidal categories. Thus, the 6-j symbols give an intermediate level of information, that in fact uniquely determines the groups in many cases, such as when the group is odd order or simple.

== See also ==
- Clebsch–Gordan coefficients
- 3-j symbol
- Racah W-coefficient
- 9-j symbol
- Representations of classical Lie groups
- Skeletonization of fusion categories
