= 3-j symbol =

Coefficients coupled with angular momentum

In quantum mechanics, the Wigner's 3-j symbols, also called 3-jm symbols, are an alternative to Clebsch–Gordan coefficients for the purpose of adding angular momenta. While the two approaches address exactly the same physical problem, the 3-j symbols do so more symmetrically.

== Mathematical relation to Clebsch–Gordan coefficients ==
The 3-j symbols are given in terms of the Clebsch–Gordan coefficients by

$$\begin{pmatrix}
j_1 & j_2 & j_3 \\
m_1 & m_2 & m_3
\end{pmatrix}
\equiv
\frac{(-1)^{j_1 - j_2 - m_3}}{\sqrt{2 j_3 + 1}}
\langle j_1 \, m_1 \, j_2 \, m_2 | j_3 \, (-m_3) \rangle.$$

The j and m components are angular-momentum quantum numbers, i.e., every j (and every corresponding m) is either a nonnegative integer or half-odd-integer. The exponent of the sign factor is always an integer, so it remains the same when transposed to the left, and the inverse relation follows upon making the substitution m_{3} → −m_{3}:

$$\langle j_1 \, m_1 \, j_2 \, m_2 | j_3 \, m_3 \rangle
= (-1)^{-j_1 + j_2 - m_3} \sqrt{2 j_3 + 1}
\begin{pmatrix}
j_1 & j_2 &  j_3 \\
m_1 & m_2 & -m_3
\end{pmatrix}.$$

== Explicit expression ==
$$\begin{align}\begin{pmatrix}
j_1 & j_2 & j_3\\
m_1 & m_2 & m_3
\end{pmatrix}
&  \equiv \delta(m_1+m_2+m_3,0) (-1)^{j_1 - j_2 - m_3} {} \sqrt{\frac{(j_1+j_2-j_3)!(j_1-j_2+j_3)!(-j_1+j_2+j_3)!}{(j_1+j_2+j_3+1)!}}\ \times {} \\[6pt]
&\times\sqrt{(j_1-m_1)!(j_1+m_1)!(j_2-m_2)!(j_2+m_2)!(j_3-m_3)!(j_3+m_3)!}\ \times {} \\[6pt]
&\times\sum_{k=K}^N \frac{(-1)^k}{k!(j_1+j_2-j_3-k)!(j_1-m_1-k)!(j_2+m_2-k)!(j_3-j_2+m_1+k)!(j_3-j_1-m_2+k)!},
\end{align}$$

where $\delta(i,j)$ is the Kronecker delta.

The summation is performed over those integer values k for which the argument of each factorial in the denominator is non-negative, i.e. summation limits K and N are taken equal: the lower one $K=\max(0, j_2-j_3-m_1, j_1-j_3+m_2),$ the upper one $N=\min(j_1+j_2-j_3, j_1-m_1, j_2+m_2).$ Factorials of negative numbers are conventionally taken equal to zero, so that the values of the 3j symbol at, for example, $j_3>j_1+j_2$ or $j_1<m_1$ are automatically set to zero.

== Definitional relation to Clebsch–Gordan coefficients ==
The CG coefficients are defined so as to express the addition of two angular momenta in terms of a third:

$$|j_3\, m_3\rangle
= \sum_{m_1=-j_1}^{j_1} \sum_{m_2=-j_2}^{j_2}
\langle j_1 \, m_1 \, j_2 \, m_2 | j_3 \, m_3 \rangle
|j_1 \, m_1 \, j_2 \, m_2 \rangle.$$

The 3-j symbols, on the other hand, are the coefficients with which three angular momenta must be added so that the resultant is zero:

$$\sum_{m_1=-j_1}^{j_1} \sum_{m_2=-j_2}^{j_2} \sum_{m_3=-j_3}^{j_3}
|j_1 m_1\rangle |j_2 m_2\rangle |j_3 m_3\rangle
\begin{pmatrix}
j_1 & j_2 & j_3\\
m_1 & m_2 & m_3
\end{pmatrix}
= |0 \, 0\rangle.$$

Here $|0 \, 0\rangle$ is the zero-angular-momentum state ($j = m = 0$). It is apparent that the 3-j symbol treats all three angular momenta involved in the addition problem on an equal footing and is therefore more symmetrical than the CG coefficient.

Since the state $|0 \, 0\rangle$ is unchanged by rotation, one also says that the contraction of the product of three rotational states with a 3-j symbol is invariant under rotations.

== Selection rules ==
The Wigner 3-j symbol is zero unless all these conditions are satisfied:

$$\begin{align}
& m_i \in \{-j_i, -j_i + 1, -j_i + 2, \ldots, j_i\} \quad (i = 1, 2, 3), \\
& m_1 + m_2 + m_3 = 0, \\
& |j_1 - j_2| \le j_3 \le j_1 + j_2, \\
& (j_1 + j_2 + j_3) \text{ is an integer (and, moreover, an even integer if } m_1 = m_2 = m_3 = 0 \text{)}. \\
\end{align}$$

== Symmetry properties ==
A 3-j symbol is invariant under an even permutation of its columns:

$$\begin{pmatrix}
j_1 & j_2 & j_3\\
m_1 & m_2 & m_3
\end{pmatrix}
=
\begin{pmatrix}
j_2 & j_3 & j_1\\
m_2 & m_3 & m_1
\end{pmatrix}
=
\begin{pmatrix}
j_3 & j_1 & j_2\\
m_3 & m_1 & m_2
\end{pmatrix}.$$

An odd permutation of the columns gives a phase factor:

$$\begin{pmatrix}
j_1 & j_2 & j_3\\
m_1 & m_2 & m_3
\end{pmatrix}
=
(-1)^{j_1+j_2+j_3}
\begin{pmatrix}
j_2 & j_1 & j_3\\
m_2 & m_1 & m_3
\end{pmatrix}$$
$$=
(-1)^{j_1+j_2+j_3}
\begin{pmatrix}
j_1 & j_3 & j_2\\
m_1 & m_3 & m_2
\end{pmatrix}
=
(-1)^{j_1+j_2+j_3}
\begin{pmatrix}
j_3 & j_2 & j_1\\
m_3 & m_2 & m_1
\end{pmatrix}.$$

Changing the sign of the $m$ quantum numbers (time reversal) also gives a phase:

$$\begin{pmatrix}
j_1 & j_2 & j_3\\
-m_1 & -m_2 & -m_3
\end{pmatrix}
=
(-1)^{j_1+j_2+j_3}
\begin{pmatrix}
j_1 & j_2 & j_3\\
m_1 & m_2 & m_3
\end{pmatrix}.$$

The 3-j symbols also have so-called Regge symmetries, which are not due to permutations or time reversal. These symmetries are:

$$\begin{pmatrix}
j_1 & j_2 & j_3\\
m_1 & m_2 & m_3
\end{pmatrix}
=
\begin{pmatrix}
j_1 & \frac{j_2+j_3-m_1}{2} & \frac{j_2+j_3+m_1}{2}\\
j_3-j_2 & \frac{j_2-j_3-m_1}{2}-m_3 & \frac{j_2-j_3+m_1}{2}+m_3
\end{pmatrix},$$
$$\begin{pmatrix}
j_1 & j_2 & j_3\\
m_1 & m_2 & m_3
\end{pmatrix}
=
(-1)^{j_1+j_2+j_3}
\begin{pmatrix}
\frac{j_2+j_3+m_1}{2} & \frac{j_1+j_3+m_2}{2} & \frac{j_1+j_2+m_3}{2}\\
j_1 - \frac{j_2+j_3-m_1}{2} & j_2 - \frac{j_1+j_3-m_2}{2} & j_3-\frac{j_1+j_2-m_3}{2}
\end{pmatrix}.$$

With the Regge symmetries, the 3-j symbol has a total of 72 symmetries. These are best displayed by the definition of a Regge symbol, which is a one-to-one correspondence between it and a 3-j symbol and assumes the properties of a semi-magic square:

$$R=
\begin{array}{|ccc|}
\hline
-j_1+j_2+j_3 & j_1-j_2+j_3 & j_1+j_2-j_3\\
j_1-m_1 & j_2-m_2 & j_3-m_3\\
j_1+m_1 & j_2+m_2 & j_3+m_3\\
\hline
\end{array},$$

whereby the 72 symmetries now correspond to 3! row and 3! column interchanges plus a transposition of the matrix. These facts can be used to devise an effective storage scheme.

== Orthogonality relations ==
A system of two angular momenta with magnitudes j_{1} and j_{2} can be described either in terms of the uncoupled basis states (labeled by the quantum numbers m_{1} and m_{2}), or the coupled basis states (labeled by j_{3} and m_{3}). The 3-j symbols constitute a unitary transformation between these two bases, and this unitarity implies the orthogonality relations

$$(2 j_3 + 1)\sum_{m_1 m_2}
\begin{pmatrix}
j_1 & j_2 & j_3\\
m_1 & m_2 & m_3
\end{pmatrix}
\begin{pmatrix}
j_1 & j_2 & j'_3\\
m_1 & m_2 & m'_3
\end{pmatrix}
= \delta_{j_3, j'_3} \delta_{m_3, m'_3} \begin{Bmatrix} j_1 & j_2 & j_3 \end{Bmatrix},$$
$$\sum_{j_3 m_3} (2 j_3 + 1)
\begin{pmatrix}
j_1 & j_2 & j_3\\
m_1 & m_2 & m_3
\end{pmatrix}
\begin{pmatrix}
j_1 & j_2 & j_3\\
m_1' & m_2' & m_3
\end{pmatrix}
= \delta_{m_1, m_1'} \delta_{m_2, m_2'}.$$

The triangular delta {j_{1} j_{2} j_{3}} is equal to 1 when the triad (j_{1}, j_{2}, j_{3}) satisfies the triangle conditions, and is zero otherwise. The triangular delta itself is sometimes confusingly called a "3-j symbol" (without the m) in analogy to 6-j and 9-j symbols, all of which are irreducible summations of 3-jm symbols where no m variables remain.

== Relation to spherical harmonics; Gaunt coefficients ==
The 3-jm symbols give the integral of the products of three spherical harmonics

$$\begin{align}
& \int Y_{l_1 m_1}(\theta, \varphi) Y_{l_2 m_2}(\theta, \varphi) Y_{l_3 m_3}(\theta, \varphi)\,\sin\theta\,\mathrm{d}\theta\,\mathrm{d}\varphi \\
&\quad = \sqrt{\frac{(2l_1 + 1)(2l_2 + 1)(2l_3 + 1)}{4\pi}}
\begin{pmatrix}
l_1 & l_2 & l_3 \\
0 & 0 & 0
\end{pmatrix}
\begin{pmatrix}
l_1 & l_2 & l_3\\
m_1 & m_2 & m_3
\end{pmatrix}
\end{align}$$

with $l_1$, $l_2$ and $l_3$ integers. These integrals are called Gaunt coefficients.

=== Relation to integrals of spin-weighted spherical harmonics ===
Similar relations exist for the spin-weighted spherical harmonics if $s_1 + s_2 + s_3 = 0$:

$$\begin{align}
& \int d\mathbf{\hat n} \,_{s_1}\!Y_{j_1 m_1}(\mathbf{\hat n}) \,_{s_2}\!Y_{j_2 m_2}(\mathbf{\hat n}) \,_{s_3}\!Y_{j_3 m_3}(\mathbf{\hat n}) \\
&\quad = \sqrt{\frac{(2j_1 + 1)(2j_2 + 1)(2j_3 + 1)}{4\pi}}
\begin{pmatrix}
j_1 & j_2 & j_3\\
m_1 & m_2 & m_3
\end{pmatrix}
\begin{pmatrix}
j_1 & j_2 & j_3\\
-s_1 & -s_2 & -s_3
\end{pmatrix}.
\end{align}$$

== Recursion relations ==
$$\begin{align}
& {-}\sqrt{(l_3 \mp s_3)(l_3 \pm s_3 + 1)}
\begin{pmatrix}
l_1 & l_2 & l_3 \\
s_1 & s_2 & s_3 \pm 1
\end{pmatrix}=
\\
&\quad = \sqrt{(l_1 \mp s_1)(l_1 \pm s_1 + 1)}
\begin{pmatrix}
l_1 & l_2 & l_3 \\
s_1 \pm 1 & s_2 & s_3
\end{pmatrix}
+ \sqrt{(l_2 \mp s_2)(l_2 \pm s_2 + 1)}
\begin{pmatrix}
l_1 & l_2 & l_3 \\
s_1 & s_2 \pm 1 & s_3
\end{pmatrix}.
\end{align}$$

== Asymptotic expressions ==
For $l_1 \ll l_2, l_3$ a non-zero 3-j symbol is

$$\begin{pmatrix}
l_1 & l_2 & l_3\\
m_1 & m_2 & m_3
\end{pmatrix}
\approx (-1)^{l_3+m_3} \frac{d^{l_1}_{m_1, l_3 - l_2}(\theta)}{\sqrt{2l_3 + 1}},$$

where $\cos(\theta) = -2m_3 / (2l_3 + 1)$, and $d^l_{mn}$ is a Wigner function. Generally a better approximation obeying the Regge symmetry is given by

$$\begin{pmatrix}
l_1 & l_2 & l_3\\
m_1 & m_2 & m_3
\end{pmatrix}
\approx (-1)^{l_3+m_3} \frac{ d^{l_1}_{m_1, l_3-l_2}(\theta)}{\sqrt{l_2+l_3+1}},$$

where $\cos(\theta) = (m_2 - m_3)/(l_2 + l_3 + 1)$.

== Metric tensor ==
The following quantity acts as a metric tensor in angular-momentum theory and is also known as a Wigner 1-jm symbol:

$$\begin{pmatrix}
j \\
m \quad m'
\end{pmatrix}
:= \sqrt{2 j + 1}
\begin{pmatrix}
j & 0 & j \\
m & 0 & m'
\end{pmatrix}
= (-1)^{j - m'} \delta_{m, -m'}.$$

It can be used to perform time reversal on angular momenta.

== Special cases and other properties ==
$$\sum_m (-1)^{j - m}
\begin{pmatrix}
j & j & J \\
m & -m & 0
\end{pmatrix} = \sqrt{2 j + 1} \, \delta_{J, 0}.$$

From equation (3.7.9) in

$$\begin{pmatrix}
j & j & 0 \\
m & -m & 0
\end{pmatrix} = \frac{1}{\sqrt{2 j + 1}} (-1)^{j - m}.$$

$$\frac{1}{2} \int_{-1}^1 P_{l_1}(x) P_{l_2}(x) P_{l}(x) \, dx =
\begin{pmatrix}
l & l_1 & l_2 \\
0 & 0 & 0
\end{pmatrix}^2,$$

where P are Legendre polynomials.

== Relation to Racah V-coefficients ==
Wigner 3-j symbols are related to Racah V-coefficients by a simple phase:

$$V(j_1 \, j_2 \, j_3; m_1 \, m_2 \, m_3) = (-1)^{j_1 - j_2 - j_3}
\begin{pmatrix}
j_1 & j_2 & j_3 \\
m_1 & m_2 & m_3
\end{pmatrix}.$$

== Relation to group theory ==
This section essentially recasts the definitional relation in the language of group theory.

A group representation of a group is a homomorphism of the group into a group of linear transformations over some vector space. The linear transformations can be given by a group of matrices with respect to some basis of the vector space.

The group of transformations leaving angular momenta invariant is the three dimensional rotation group SO(3). When "spin" angular momenta are included, the group is its double covering group, SU(2).

A reducible representation is one where a change of basis can be applied to bring all the matrices into block diagonal form. A representation is irreducible (irrep) if no such transformation exists.

For each value of j, the 2j+1 kets form a basis for an irreducible representation (irrep) of SO(3)/SU(2) over the complex numbers. Given two irreps, the tensor direct product can be reduced to a sum of irreps, giving rise to the Clebsch-Gordon coefficients, or by reduction of the triple product of three irreps to the trivial irrep 1 giving rise to the 3j symbols.

== 3j symbols for other groups ==
The $3j$ symbol has been most intensely studied in the context of the coupling of angular momentum. For this, it is strongly related to the group representation theory of the groups SU(2) and SO(3) as discussed above. However, many other groups are of importance in physics and chemistry, and there has been much work on the $3j$ symbol for these other groups. In this section, some of that work is considered.

=== Simply reducible groups ===
The original paper by Wigner was not restricted to SO(3)/SU(2) but instead focussed on simply reducible (SR) groups. These are groups in which

- all classes are ambivalent i.e. if $X$ is a member of a class then so is $X^{-1}$
- the Kronecker product of two irreps is multiplicity free i.e. does not contain any irrep more than once.

For SR groups, every irrep is equivalent to its complex conjugate, and under permutations of the columns the absolute value of the symbol is invariant and the phase of each can be chosen so that they at most change sign under odd permutations and remain unchanged under even permutations.

=== General compact groups ===
Compact groups form a wide class of groups with topological structure. They include the finite groups with added discrete topology and many of the Lie groups.

General compact groups will neither be ambivalent nor multiplicity free. Derome and Sharp and Derome examined the $3j$ symbol for the general case using the relation to the Clebsch-Gordon coefficients of

$$\begin{pmatrix}
j_1 & j_2 & j_3 \\
m_1 & m_2 & m_3
\end{pmatrix}
\equiv
\frac{1}{[j_3]}
\langle j_1 \, m_1 \, j_2 \, m_2 | j_3^* \, m_3 \rangle.$$

where $[j]$ is the dimension of the representation space of $j$ and $j_3^*$ is the complex conjugate representation to $j_3$.

By examining permutations of columns of the $3j$ symbol, they showed three cases:

- if all of $j_1, j_2, j_3$ are inequivalent then the $3j$ symbol may be chosen to be invariant under any permutation of its columns
- if exactly two are equivalent, then transpositions of its columns may be chosen so that some symbols will be invariant while others will change sign. An approach using a wreath product of the group with $S_3$ showed that these correspond to the representations $[2]$ or $[1^2]$ of the symmetric group $S_2$. Cyclic permutations leave the $3j$ symbol invariant.
- if all three are equivalent, the behaviour is dependent on the representations of the symmetric group$S_3$. Wreath group representations corresponding to $[3]$ are invariant under transpositions of the columns, corresponding to $[1^3]$ change sign under transpositions, while a pair corresponding to the two dimensional representation $[21]$ transform according to that.

Further research into $3j$ symbols for compact groups has been performed based on these principles.

=== SU(n) ===
The Special unitary group SU(n) is the Lie group of n × n unitary matrices with determinant 1.

The group SU(3) is important in particle theory. There are many papers dealing with the $3j$ or equivalent symbol

The $3j$ symbol for the group SU(4) has been studied while there is also work on the general SU(n) groups

=== Crystallographic point groups ===
There are many papers dealing with the $3j$ symbols or Clebsch-Gordon coefficients for the finite crystallographic point groups and the double point groups The book by Butler references these and details the theory along with tables.

=== Magnetic groups ===
Magnetic groups include antilinear operators as well as linear operators. They need to be dealt with using Wigner's theory of corepresentations of unitary and antiunitary groups. A significant departure from standard representation theory is that the multiplicity of the irreducible corepresentation $j_3^*$ in the direct product of the irreducible corepresentations $j_1 \otimes j_2$ is generally smaller than the multiplicity of the trivial corepresentation in the triple product $j_1 \otimes j_2 \otimes j_3$, leading to significant differences between the Clebsch-Gordon coefficients and the $3j$ symbol.

The $3j$ symbols have been examined for the grey groups and for the magnetic point groups

== See also ==
- Clebsch–Gordan coefficients
- Spherical harmonics
- 6-j symbol
- 9-j symbol
- Representations of classical Lie groups
