= Angular momentum coupling =

Coupling in quantum physics

In quantum mechanics, angular momentum coupling is the procedure of constructing eigenstates of total angular momentum out of eigenstates of separate angular momenta. For instance, the orbit and spin of a single particle can interact through spin–orbit interaction, in which case the complete physical picture must include spin–orbit coupling. Or two charged particles, each with a well-defined angular momentum, may interact by Coulomb forces, in which case coupling of the two one-particle angular momenta to a total angular momentum is a useful step in the solution of the two-particle Schrödinger equation. In both cases the separate angular momenta are no longer constants of motion, but the sum of the two angular momenta usually still is. Angular momentum coupling in atoms is of importance in atomic spectroscopy. Angular momentum coupling of electron spins is of importance in quantum chemistry. Also in the nuclear shell model angular momentum coupling is ubiquitous.

In astronomy, spin–orbit coupling reflects the general law of conservation of angular momentum, which holds for celestial systems as well. In simple cases, the direction of the angular momentum vector is neglected, and the spin–orbit coupling is the ratio between the frequency with which a planet or other celestial body spins about its own axis to that with which it orbits another body. This is more commonly known as orbital resonance. Often, the underlying physical effects are tidal forces.

== General theory and detailed origin ==
Orbital angular momentum (denoted l or L).

=== Angular momentum conservation ===
Conservation of angular momentum is the principle that the total angular momentum of a system has a constant magnitude and direction if the system is subjected to no external torque. Angular momentum is a property of a physical system that is a constant of motion (also referred to as a conserved property, time-independent and well-defined) in two situations:

1. The system experiences a spherically symmetric potential field.
2. The system moves (in quantum mechanical sense) in isotropic space.

In both cases the angular momentum operator commutes with the Hamiltonian of the system. By Heisenberg's uncertainty relation this means that the angular momentum and the energy (eigenvalue of the Hamiltonian) can be measured at the same time.

An example of the first situation is an atom whose electrons only experience the Coulomb force of its atomic nucleus. If we ignore the electron–electron interaction (and other small interactions such as spin–orbit coupling), the orbital angular momentum l of each electron commutes with the total Hamiltonian. In this model the atomic Hamiltonian is a sum of kinetic energies of the electrons and the spherically symmetric electron–nucleus interactions. The individual electron angular momenta l_{i} commute with this Hamiltonian. That is, they are conserved properties of this approximate model of the atom.

An example of the second situation is a rigid rotor moving in field-free space. A rigid rotor has a well-defined, time-independent, angular momentum.

These two situations originate in classical mechanics. The third kind of conserved angular momentum, associated with spin, does not have a classical counterpart. However, all rules of angular momentum coupling apply to spin as well.

In general the conservation of angular momentum implies full rotational symmetry (described by the groups SO(3) and SU(2)) and, conversely, spherical symmetry implies conservation of angular momentum. If two or more physical systems have conserved angular momenta, it can be useful to combine these momenta to a total angular momentum of the combined system—a conserved property of the total system. The building of eigenstates of the total conserved angular momentum from the angular momentum eigenstates of the individual subsystems is referred to as angular momentum coupling.

Application of angular momentum coupling is useful when there is an interaction between subsystems that, without interaction, would have conserved angular momentum. By the very interaction the spherical symmetry of the subsystems is broken, but the angular momentum of the total system remains a constant of motion. Use of the latter fact is helpful in the solution of the Schrödinger equation.

=== Examples ===
As an example we consider two electrons, in an atom (say the helium atom) labeled with i = 1 and 2. If there is no electron–electron interaction, but only electron–nucleus interaction, then the two electrons can be rotated around the nucleus independently of each other; nothing happens to their energy. The expectation values of both operators, l_{1} and l_{2}, are conserved. However, if we switch on the electron–electron interaction that depends on the distance d(1,2) between the electrons, then only a simultaneous and equal rotation of the two electrons will leave d(1,2) invariant. In such a case the expectation value of neither l_{1} nor l_{2} is a constant of motion in general, but the expectation value of the total orbital angular momentum operator L = l_{1} + l_{2} is. Given the eigenstates of l_{1} and l_{2}, the construction of eigenstates of L (which still is conserved) is the coupling of the angular momenta of electrons 1 and 2.

The total orbital angular momentum quantum number L is restricted to integer values and must satisfy the triangular condition that $|l_1 - l_2| \leq L \leq l_1 + l_2$, such that the three nonnegative integer values could correspond to the three sides of a triangle.

In quantum mechanics, coupling also exists between angular momenta belonging to different Hilbert spaces of a single object, e.g. its spin and its orbital angular momentum. If the spin has half-integer values, such as 1/2 for an electron, then the total (orbital plus spin) angular momentum will also be restricted to half-integer values.

Reiterating slightly differently the above: one expands the quantum states of composed systems (i.e. made of subunits like two hydrogen atoms or two electrons) in basis sets which are made of tensor products of quantum states which in turn describe the subsystems individually. We assume that the states of the subsystems can be chosen as eigenstates of their angular momentum operators (and of their component along any arbitrary z axis).

The subsystems are therefore correctly described by a pair of ℓ, m quantum numbers (see angular momentum for details). When there is interaction among the subsystems, the total Hamiltonian contains terms that do not commute with the angular operators acting on the subsystems only. However, these terms do commute with the total angular momentum operator. Sometimes one refers to the non-commuting interaction terms in the Hamiltonian as angular momentum coupling terms, because they necessitate the angular momentum coupling.

== Spin–orbit coupling ==
The behavior of atoms and smaller particles is well described by the theory of quantum mechanics, in which each particle has an intrinsic angular momentum called spin and specific configurations (of e.g. electrons in an atom) are described by a set of quantum numbers. Collections of particles also have angular momenta and corresponding quantum numbers, and under different circumstances the angular momenta of the parts couple in different ways to form the angular momentum of the whole. Angular momentum coupling is a category including some of the ways that subatomic particles can interact with each other.

In atomic physics, spin–orbit coupling, also known as spin-pairing, describes a weak magnetic interaction, or coupling, of the particle spin and the orbital motion of this particle, e.g. the electron spin and its motion around an atomic nucleus. One of its effects is to separate the energy of internal states of the atom, e.g. spin-aligned and spin-antialigned that would otherwise be identical in energy. This interaction is responsible for many of the details of atomic structure.

In solid-state physics, the spin coupling with the orbital motion can lead to splitting of energy bands due to Dresselhaus or Rashba effects.

In the macroscopic world of orbital mechanics, the term spin–orbit coupling is sometimes used in the same sense as spin–orbit resonance.

=== LS coupling ===
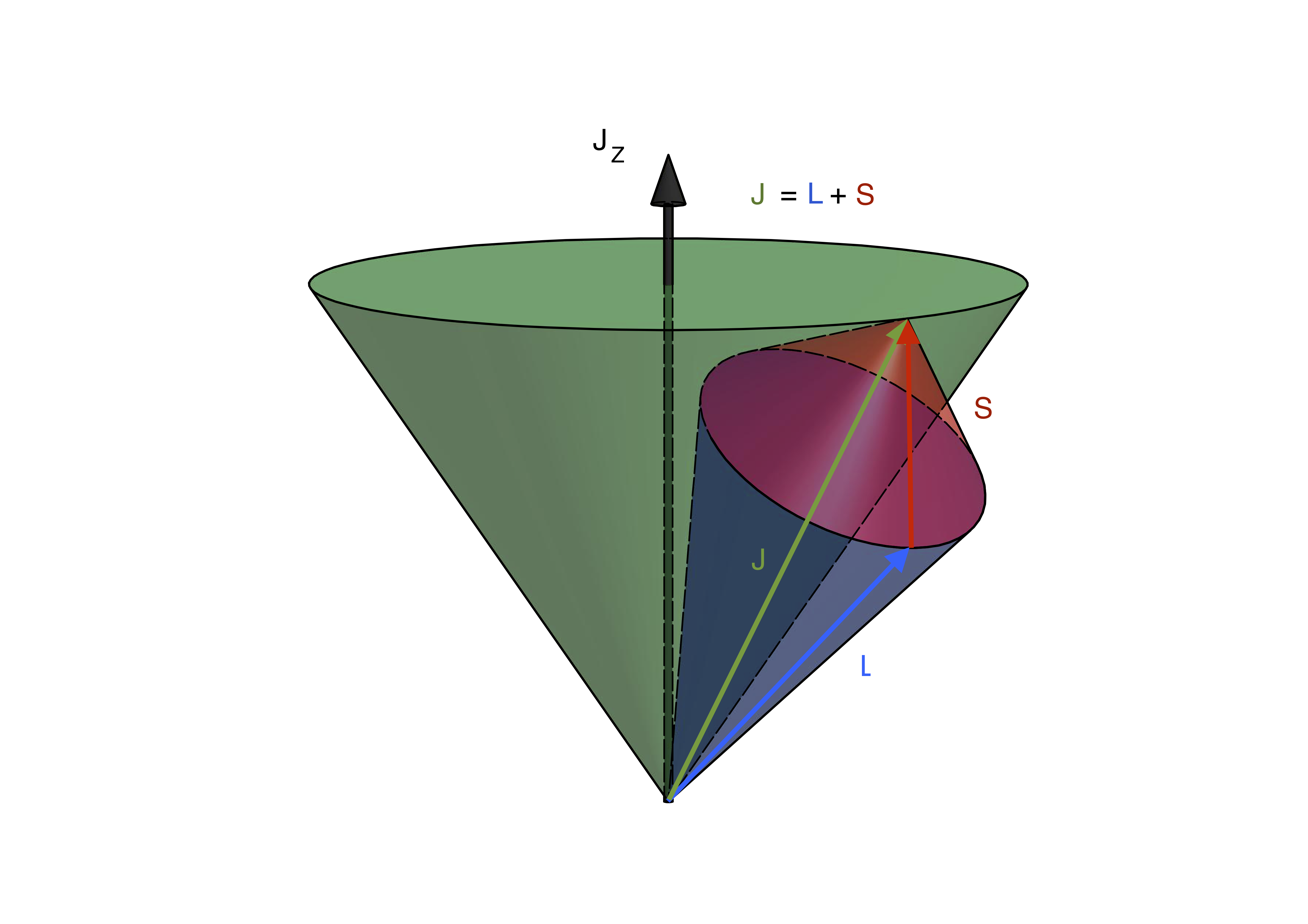
Illustration of L–S coupling. Total angular momentum J is green, orbital L is blue, and spin S is red.

In light atoms (generally Z ≤ 30), electron spins s_{i} interact among themselves so they combine to form a total spin angular momentum S. The same happens with orbital angular momenta ℓ_{i}, forming a total orbital angular momentum L. The interaction between the quantum numbers L and S is called Russell–Saunders coupling (after Henry Norris Russell and Frederick Saunders) or LS coupling. Then S and L couple together and form a total angular momentum J:

$$\mathbf J = \mathbf L + \mathbf S, \,$$

where L and S are the totals:

$$\mathbf L = \sum_i \boldsymbol{\ell}_i, \ \mathbf S = \sum_i \mathbf{s}_i. \,$$

This is an approximation which is good as long as any external magnetic fields are weak. In larger magnetic fields, these two momenta decouple, giving rise to a different splitting pattern in the energy levels (the Paschen–Back effect), and the size of LS coupling term becomes small.

For an extensive example on how LS-coupling is practically applied, see the article on term symbols.

=== jj coupling ===
In heavier atoms the situation is different. In atoms with bigger nuclear charges, spin–orbit interactions are frequently as large as or larger than spin–spin interactions or orbit–orbit interactions. In this situation, each orbital angular momentum ℓ_{i} tends to combine with the corresponding individual spin angular momentum s_{i}, originating an individual total angular momentum j_{i}. These then couple up to form the total angular momentum J

$$\mathbf J = \sum_i \mathbf j_i = \sum_i (\boldsymbol{\ell}_i + \mathbf{s}_i).$$

This description, facilitating calculation of this kind of interaction, is known as jj coupling.

== Spin–spin coupling ==
Spin–spin coupling is the coupling of the intrinsic angular momentum (spin) of different particles. J-coupling between pairs of nuclear spins is an important feature of nuclear magnetic resonance (NMR) spectroscopy as it can provide detailed information about the structure and conformation of molecules. Spin–spin coupling between nuclear spin and electronic spin is responsible for hyperfine structure in atomic spectra.

== Term symbols ==
Term symbols are used to represent the states and spectral transitions of atoms, they are found from coupling of angular momenta mentioned above. When the state of an atom has been specified with a term symbol, the allowed transitions can be found through selection rules by considering which transitions would conserve angular momentum. A photon has spin 1, and when there is a transition with emission or absorption of a photon the atom will need to change state to conserve angular momentum. The term symbol selection rules are: ΔS = 0; ΔL = 0, ±1; Δl = ± 1; ΔJ = 0, ±1 .

The expression "term symbol" is derived from the "term series" associated with the Rydberg states of an atom and their energy levels. In the Rydberg formula the frequency or wave number of the light emitted by a hydrogen-like atom is proportional to the difference between the two terms of a transition. The series known to early spectroscopy were designated sharp, principal, diffuse, and fundamental and consequently the letters S, P, D, and F were used to represent the orbital angular momentum states of an atom.

== Relativistic effects ==
In very heavy atoms, relativistic shifting of the energies of the electron energy levels accentuates spin–orbit coupling effect. Thus, for example, uranium molecular orbital diagrams must directly incorporate relativistic symbols when considering interactions with other atoms.

== Nuclear coupling ==
In atomic nuclei, the spin–orbit interaction is much stronger than for atomic electrons, and is incorporated directly into the nuclear shell model. In addition, unlike atomic–electron term symbols, the lowest energy state is not L − S, but rather, ℓ + s. All nuclear levels whose ℓ value (orbital angular momentum) is greater than zero are thus split in the shell model to create states designated by ℓ + s and ℓ − s. Due to the nature of the shell model, which assumes an average potential rather than a central Coulombic potential, the nucleons that go into the ℓ + s and ℓ − s nuclear states are considered degenerate within each orbital (e.g. The 2p3/2 contains four nucleons, all of the same energy. Higher in energy is the 2p1/2 which contains two equal-energy nucleons).

== See also ==
- Clebsch–Gordan coefficients
- Angular momentum diagrams (quantum mechanics)
- Spherical basis
