= Spin-weighted spherical harmonics =

Special functions

In special functions, a topic in mathematics, spin-weighted spherical harmonics are generalizations of the standard spherical harmonics and—like the usual spherical harmonics—are functions on the sphere. Unlike ordinary spherical harmonics, the spin-weighted harmonics are U(1) gauge fields rather than scalar fields: mathematically, they take values in a complex line bundle. The spin-weighted harmonics are organized by degree l, just like ordinary spherical harmonics, but have an additional spin weight s that reflects the additional U(1) symmetry. A special basis of harmonics can be derived from the Laplace spherical harmonics Y_{lm}, and are typically denoted by _{s}Y_{lm}, where l and m are the usual parameters familiar from the standard Laplace spherical harmonics. In this special basis, the spin-weighted spherical harmonics appear as actual functions, because the choice of a polar axis fixes the U(1) gauge ambiguity. The spin-weighted spherical harmonics can be obtained from the standard spherical harmonics by application of spin raising and lowering operators. In particular, the spin-weighted spherical harmonics of spin weight s = 0 are simply the standard spherical harmonics:

$${}_0Y_{l m} = Y_{l m}\ .$$

Spaces of spin-weighted spherical harmonics were first identified in connection with the representation theory of the Lorentz group (Gelfand, Minlos & Shapiro 1958). They were subsequently and independently rediscovered by Newman & Penrose (1966) and applied to describe gravitational radiation, and again by Wu & Yang (1976) as so-called "monopole harmonics" in the study of Dirac monopoles.

== Spin-weighted functions ==
Regard the sphere S^{2} as embedded into the three-dimensional Euclidean space R^{3}. At a point x on the sphere, a positively oriented orthonormal basis of tangent vectors at x is a pair a, b of vectors such that

$$\begin{align}
\mathbf{x}\cdot\mathbf{a} = \mathbf{x}\cdot\mathbf{b} &= 0\\
\mathbf{a}\cdot\mathbf{a} = \mathbf{b}\cdot\mathbf{b} &= 1\\
\mathbf{a}\cdot\mathbf{b} &= 0\\
\mathbf{x}\cdot (\mathbf{a}\times\mathbf{b}) &> 0,
\end{align}$$

where the first pair of equations states that a and b are tangent at x, the second pair states that a and b are unit vectors, the penultimate equation that a and b are orthogonal, and the final equation that (x, a, b) is a right-handed basis of R^{3}.

A spin-weight s function f is a function accepting as input a point x of S^{2} and a positively oriented orthonormal basis of tangent vectors at x, such that

$$f\bigl(\mathbf x,(\cos\theta)\mathbf{a}-(\sin\theta)\mathbf{b}, (\sin\theta)\mathbf{a} + (\cos\theta)\mathbf{b}\bigr) = e^{is\theta}f(\mathbf x,\mathbf{a},\mathbf{b})$$

for every rotation angle θ.

Following Eastwood & Tod (1982), denote the collection of all spin-weight s functions by B(s). Concretely, these are understood as functions f on C^{2}\{0} satisfying the following homogeneity law under complex scaling

$$f\left(\lambda z,\overline{\lambda}\bar{z}\right) = \left(\frac{\overline{\lambda}}{\lambda}\right)^s f\left(z,\bar{z}\right).$$

This makes sense provided s is a half-integer.

Abstractly, B(s) is isomorphic to the smooth vector bundle underlying the antiholomorphic vector bundle O̅(2̅s̅) of the Serre twist on the complex projective line CP^{1}. A section of the latter bundle is a function g on C^{2}\{0} satisfying

$$g\left(\lambda z,\overline{\lambda}\bar{z}\right) = \overline{\lambda}^{2s} g\left(z,\bar{z}\right).$$

Given such a g, we may produce a spin-weight s function by multiplying by a suitable power of the hermitian form

$$P\left(z,\bar{z}\right) = z\cdot\bar{z}.$$

Specifically, f = P^{−s}g is a spin-weight s function. The association of a spin-weighted function to an ordinary homogeneous function is an isomorphism.

=== The operator ð ===
The spin weight bundles B(s) are equipped with a differential operator ð (eth). This operator is essentially the Dolbeault operator, after suitable identifications have been made,

$$\partial : \overline{\mathbf O(2s)} \to \mathcal{E}^{1,0}\otimes \overline{\mathbf O(2s)} \cong \overline{\mathbf O(2s)}\otimes\mathbf{O}(-2).$$

Thus for f ∈ B(s),

$$\eth f \ \stackrel{\text{def}}{=}\ P^{-s+1}\partial \left(P^s f\right)$$

defines a function of spin-weight s + 1.

== Spin-weighted harmonics ==
Just as conventional spherical harmonics are the eigenfunctions of the Laplace-Beltrami operator on the sphere, the spin-weight s harmonics are the eigensections for the Laplace-Beltrami operator acting on the bundles E(s) of spin-weight s functions.

== Representation as functions ==
The spin-weighted harmonics can be represented as functions on a sphere once a point on the sphere has been selected to serve as the North pole. By definition, a function η with spin weight s transforms under rotation about the pole via

$$\eta \rightarrow e^{i s \psi}\eta.$$

Working in standard spherical coordinates, we can define a particular operator ð acting on a function η as:

$$\eth\eta =  - \left(\sin{\theta}\right)^s \left\{ \frac{\partial}{\partial \theta} + \frac{i}{\sin{\theta}} \frac{\partial} {\partial \phi} \right\} \left[ \left(\sin{\theta}\right)^{-s} \eta \right].$$

This gives us another function of θ and φ. (The operator ð is effectively a covariant derivative operator in the sphere.)

An important property of the new function ðη is that if η had spin weight s, ðη has spin weight s + 1. Thus, the operator raises the spin weight of a function by 1. Similarly, we can define an operator ð̅ which will lower the spin weight of a function by 1:

$$\bar\eth\eta =  - \left(\sin{\theta}\right)^{-s} \left\{ \frac{\partial}{\partial \theta} - \frac{i}{\sin{\theta}} \frac{\partial} {\partial \phi} \right\} \left[ \left(\sin{\theta}\right)^{s} \eta \right].$$

The spin-weighted spherical harmonics are then defined in terms of the usual spherical harmonics as:

$${}_sY_{l m} = \begin{cases}
\sqrt{\frac{(l-s)!}{(l+s)!}}\ \eth^s Y_{l m},&& 0\leq s \leq l; \\
\sqrt{\frac{(l+s)!}{(l-s)!}}\ \left(-1\right)^s \bar\eth^{-s} Y_{l m},&& -l\leq s \leq 0; \\
0,&&l < |s|.\end{cases}$$

The functions _{s}Y_{lm} then have the property of transforming with spin weight s.

Other important properties include the following:

$$\begin{align}
\eth\left({}_sY_{l m}\right)     &= +\sqrt{(l-s)(l+s+1)}\, {}_{s+1}Y_{l m};\\
\bar\eth\left({}_sY_{l m}\right) &= -\sqrt{(l+s)(l-s+1)}\, {}_{s-1}Y_{l m};
\end{align}$$

== Orthogonality and completeness ==
The harmonics are orthogonal over the entire sphere:

$$\int_{S^2} {}_sY_{l m}\, {}_s\bar{Y}_{l'm'}\, dS = \delta_{ll'} \delta_{mm'},$$

and satisfy the completeness relation

$$\sum_{l m} {}_s\bar Y_{l m}\left(\theta',\phi'\right) {}_s Y_{l m}(\theta,\phi) = \delta\left(\phi'-\phi\right)\delta\left(\cos\theta'-\cos\theta\right)$$

== Calculating ==
These harmonics can be explicitly calculated by several methods. The obvious recursion relation results from repeatedly applying the raising or lowering operators. Formulae for direct calculation were derived by Goldberg et al. (1967). Note that their formulae use an old choice for the Condon–Shortley phase. The convention chosen below is in agreement with Mathematica, for instance.

The more useful of the Goldberg, et al., formulae is the following:

$${}_sY_{l m} (\theta, \phi) = \left(-1\right)^{l+m-s} \sqrt{ \frac{(l+m)! (l-m)! (2l+1)} {4\pi (l+s)! (l-s)!} } \sin^{2l} \left( \frac{\theta}{2} \right) e^{i m \phi} \times\sum_{r=0}^{l-s} \left(-1\right)^{r} {l-s \choose r} {l+s \choose r+s-m}  \cot^{2r+s-m} \left( \frac{\theta} {2} \right)\, .$$

A Mathematica notebook using this formula to calculate arbitrary spin-weighted spherical harmonics can be found here.

With the phase convention here:

$$\begin{align}
{}_s\bar Y_{l m} &= \left(-1\right)^{s+m}{}_{-s}Y_{l(-m)}\\
{}_sY_{l m}(\pi-\theta,\phi+\pi) &= \left(-1\right)^l {}_{-s}Y_{l m}(\theta,\phi).
\end{align}$$

== First few spin-weighted spherical harmonics ==
Analytic expressions for the first few orthonormalized spin-weighted spherical harmonics:

=== Spin-weight s = 1, degree l = 1 ===
$$\begin{align}
{}_1 Y_{10}(\theta,\phi)     &=  \sqrt{\frac{3}{8\pi}}\,\sin\theta \\
{}_1 Y_{1\pm 1}(\theta,\phi) &= -\sqrt{\frac{3}{16\pi}}(1 \mp \cos\theta)\,e^{\pm i\phi}
\end{align}$$

== Relation to Wigner rotation matrices ==
$$D^l_{-m s}(\phi,\theta,-\psi) =\left(-1\right)^m \sqrt\frac{4\pi}{2l+1} {}_sY_{l m}(\theta,\phi) e^{is\psi}$$

This relation allows the spin harmonics to be calculated using recursion relations for the D-matrices.

== Triple integral ==
The triple integral in the case that s_{1} + s_{2} + s_{3} = 0 is given in terms of the 3-j symbol:

$$\int_{S^2} \,{}_{s_1} Y_{j_1 m_1}
\,{}_{s_2} Y_{j_2m_2}\, {}_{s_3} Y_{j_3m_3} = \sqrt{\frac{\left(2j_1+1\right)\left(2j_2+1\right)\left(2j_3+1\right)}{4\pi}}
\begin{pmatrix}
j_1 & j_2 & j_3\\
m_1 & m_2 & m_3
\end{pmatrix}
\begin{pmatrix}
j_1 & j_2 & j_3\\
-s_1 & -s_2 & -s_3
\end{pmatrix}$$

== See also ==
- Spherical basis
