= Rotation operator =

Rotation operator may refer to:

- An operator that specifies a rotation (mathematics)
  - Three-dimensional rotation operator
  - Two-dimensional rotation operator
  - Rot (operator) aka Curl, a differential operator in mathematics
- Rotation operator (quantum mechanics)
