= Tensor operator =

Tensor operator generalizes the notion of operators which are scalars and vectors

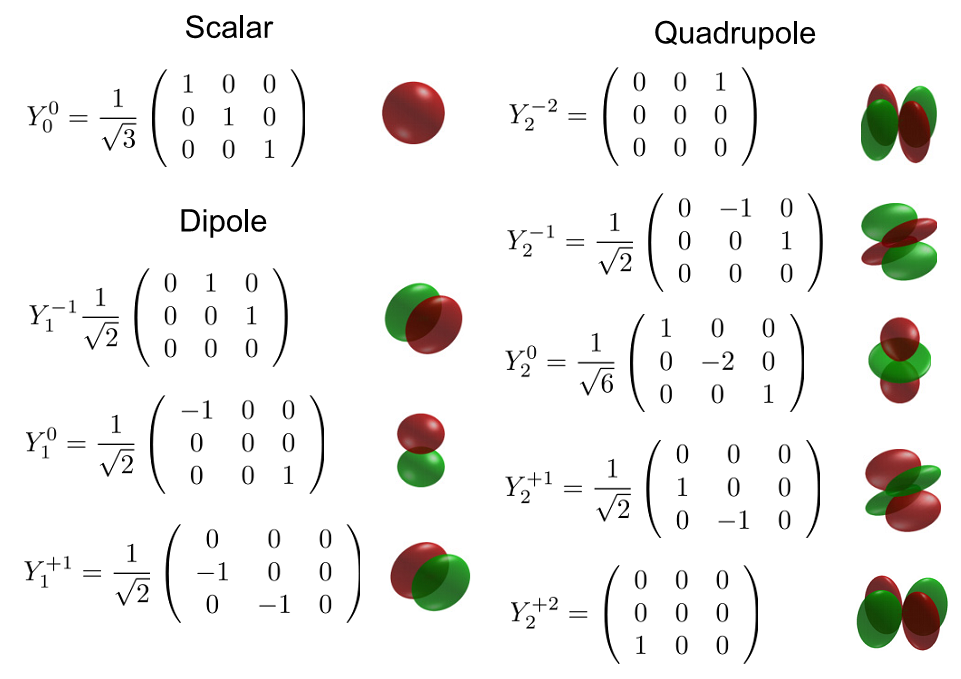
Tensor operators

In pure and applied mathematics, quantum mechanics and computer graphics, a tensor operator generalizes the notion of operators which are scalars and vectors. A special class of these are spherical tensor operators which apply the notion of the spherical basis and spherical harmonics. The spherical basis closely relates to the description of angular momentum in quantum mechanics and spherical harmonic functions. The coordinate-free generalization of a tensor operator is known as a representation operator.

== The general notion of scalar, vector, and tensor operators ==
In quantum mechanics, physical observables that are scalars, vectors, and tensors, must be represented by scalar, vector, and tensor operators, respectively. Whether something is a scalar, vector, or tensor depends on how it is viewed by two observers whose coordinate frames are related to each other by a rotation. Alternatively, one may ask how, for a single observer, a physical quantity transforms if the state of the system is rotated. Consider, for example, a system consisting of a molecule of mass $M$, traveling with a definite center of mass momentum, $p {\mathbf{\hat z}}$, in the $z$ direction. If we rotate the system by $90^{\circ}$ about the $y$ axis, the momentum will change to $p {\mathbf{\hat x}}$, which is in the $x$ direction. The center-of-mass kinetic energy of the molecule will, however, be unchanged at $p^2/2M$. The kinetic energy is a scalar and the momentum is a vector, and these two quantities must be represented by a scalar and a vector operator, respectively. By the latter in particular, we mean an operator whose expected values in the initial and the rotated states are $p {\mathbf{\hat z}}$ and $p {\mathbf{\hat x}}$. The kinetic energy on the other hand must be represented by a scalar operator, whose expected value must be the same in the initial and the rotated states.

In the same way, tensor quantities must be represented by tensor operators. An example of a tensor quantity (of rank two) is the electrical quadrupole moment of the above molecule. Likewise, the octupole and hexadecapole moments would be tensors of rank three and four, respectively.

Other examples of scalar operators are the total energy operator (more commonly called the Hamiltonian), the potential energy, and the dipole-dipole interaction energy of two atoms. Examples of vector operators are the momentum, the position, the orbital angular momentum, ${\mathbf L}$, and the spin angular momentum, ${\mathbf S}$. (Fine print: Angular momentum is a vector as far as rotations are concerned, but unlike position or momentum it does not change sign under space inversion, and when one wishes to provide this information, it is said to be a pseudovector.)

Scalar, vector and tensor operators can also be formed by products of operators. For example, the scalar product ${\mathbf L}\cdot{\mathbf S}$ of the two vector operators, ${\mathbf L}$ and ${\mathbf S}$, is a scalar operator, which figures prominently in discussions of the spin–orbit interaction. Similarly, the quadrupole moment tensor of our example molecule has the nine components

$$Q_{ij} = \sum_{\alpha} q_{\alpha} \left(3 r_{\alpha, i}r_{\alpha, j} - r_{\alpha}^{2} \delta_{ij}\right).$$
Here, the indices $i$ and $j$ can independently take on the values 1, 2, and 3 (or $x$, $y$, and $z$) corresponding to the three Cartesian axes, the index $\alpha$ runs over all particles (electrons and nuclei) in the molecule, $q_{\alpha}$ is the charge on particle $\alpha$, and $r_{\alpha, i}$ is the $i$-th component of the position of this particle. Each term in the sum is a tensor operator. In particular, the nine products $r_{\alpha, i}r_{\alpha, j}$ together form a second rank tensor, formed by taking the outer product of the vector operator ${\mathbf r}_{\alpha}$ with itself.

== Rotations of quantum states ==
=== Quantum rotation operator ===
The rotation operator about the unit vector n (defining the axis of rotation) through angle θ is

$$U[R(\theta, \hat{\mathbf{n}})] = \exp\left(-\frac{i\theta}{\hbar}\hat{\mathbf{n}}\cdot\mathbf{J}\right)$$

where J = (J_{x}, J_{y}, J_{z}) are the rotation generators (also the angular momentum matrices):

$$J_x = \frac{\hbar}{\sqrt{2}}\begin{pmatrix}
0 & 1 & 0 \\
1 & 0 & 1 \\
0 & 1 & 0
\end{pmatrix}\,\quad J_y = \frac{\hbar }{\sqrt{2}}\begin{pmatrix}
0 & i & 0 \\
-i & 0 & i \\
0 & -i & 0
\end{pmatrix}\,\quad J_z = \hbar\begin{pmatrix}
-1 & 0 & 0 \\
0 & 0 & 0 \\
0 & 0 & 1
\end{pmatrix}$$

and let $\widehat{R} = \widehat{R}(\theta,\hat{\mathbf{n}})$ be a rotation matrix. According to the Rodrigues' rotation formula, the rotation operator then amounts to
$$U[R(\theta, \hat{\mathbf{n}})] = 1\!\!1  - \frac{i\sin\theta}{\hbar}\hat{\mathbf{n}}\cdot\mathbf{J} -\frac{1-\cos \theta}{\hbar^2} ( \hat{\mathbf{n}}\cdot\mathbf{J} )^2.$$

An operator $\widehat{\Omega}$ is invariant under a unitary transformation U if
$$\widehat{\Omega} = {U}^\dagger \widehat{\Omega} U ;$$
in this case for the rotation $\widehat{U}(R)$,
$$\widehat{\Omega} = {U(R)}^\dagger \widehat{\Omega} U(R) = \exp\left(\frac{i\theta}{\hbar}\hat{\mathbf{n}}\cdot\mathbf{J}\right) \widehat{\Omega} \exp\left(-\frac{i\theta}{\hbar}\hat{\mathbf{n}}\cdot\mathbf{J}\right) .$$

=== Angular momentum eigenkets ===
The orthonormal basis set for total angular momentum is $|j,m\rangle$, where j is the total angular momentum quantum number and m is the magnetic angular momentum quantum number, which takes values −j, −j + 1, ..., j − 1, j. A general state within the j subspace

$$| \psi \rangle = \sum_m c_{jm}|j,m\rangle$$

rotates to a new state by:

$$|\bar{\psi} \rangle = U(R)|\psi \rangle = \sum_m c_{jm} U(R)|j,m\rangle$$

Using the completeness condition:

$$I = \sum_{m'} |j , m' \rangle \langle j, m' |$$

we have

$$| \bar{\psi} \rangle = I U(R)|\psi \rangle = \sum_{mm'} c_{jm} | j , m' \rangle \langle j, m' | U(R) |j , m \rangle$$

Introducing the Wigner D matrix elements:

$${D(R)}^{(j)}_{m'm} = \langle j, m' | U(R) |j,m \rangle$$

gives the matrix multiplication:

$$| \bar{\psi} \rangle = \sum_{mm'} c_{jm} D^{(j)}_{m'm} | j , m' \rangle \quad \Rightarrow \quad | \bar{\psi} \rangle = D^{(j)} | \psi \rangle$$

For one basis ket:

$$| \overline{j , m} \rangle = \sum_{m'} {D(R)}^{(j)}_{m'm} | j , m' \rangle$$

For the case of orbital angular momentum, the eigenstates $|\ell,m\rangle$ of the orbital angular momentum operator L and solutions of Laplace's equation on a 3d sphere are spherical harmonics:

$$Y_\ell^m( \theta , \phi ) = \langle \theta,\phi | \ell , m \rangle =  \sqrt{{(2\ell+1)\over 4\pi}{(\ell-m)!\over (\ell+m)!}}  \, P_\ell^m ( \cos{\theta} ) \, e^{i m \phi }$$

where P_{ℓ}^{m} is an associated Legendre polynomial, ℓ is the orbital angular momentum quantum number, and m is the orbital magnetic quantum number which takes the values −ℓ, −ℓ + 1, ... ℓ − 1, ℓ The formalism of spherical harmonics have wide applications in applied mathematics, and are closely related to the formalism of spherical tensors, as shown below.

Spherical harmonics are functions of the polar and azimuthal angles, ϕ and θ respectively, which can be conveniently collected into a unit vector n(θ, ϕ) pointing in the direction of those angles, in the Cartesian basis it is:

$$\hat{\mathbf{n}}(\theta,\phi) = \cos\phi \sin\theta \mathbf{e}_x + \sin\phi \sin\theta \mathbf{e}_y + \cos\theta \mathbf{e}_z$$

So a spherical harmonic can also be written $Y_{\ell}^{m}=\langle \mathbf{n}|\ell m\rangle$. Spherical harmonic states $|m,\ell\rangle$ rotate according to the inverse rotation matrix $U(R^{-1})$, while $|\ell,m\rangle$ rotates by the initial rotation matrix $\widehat{U}(R)$.

$$| \overline{\ell , m} \rangle = \sum_{m'} D_{m'm}^{(\ell)} [U(R^{-1})] | \ell , m' \rangle\,,\quad | \overline{\hat{\mathbf{n}}} \rangle = U(R) | \hat{\mathbf{n}}\rangle$$

== Rotation of tensor operators ==
We define the Rotation of an operator by requiring that the expectation value of the original operator $\widehat{\mathbf{A}}$ with respect to the initial state be equal to the expectation value of the rotated operator with respect to the rotated state,

$$\langle \psi' | \widehat{A'} | \psi' \rangle = \langle \psi | \widehat{A} | \psi \rangle$$

Now as,

$$| \psi \rangle ~\rightarrow~ | \psi' \rangle = U(R) | \psi \rangle \,, \quad \langle \psi | ~\rightarrow~ \langle \psi' | = \langle \psi | U^\dagger (R)$$

we have,

$$\langle \psi | U^\dagger (R) \widehat{A}' U(R)| \psi \rangle = \langle \psi | \widehat{A} | \psi \rangle$$

since, $| \psi \rangle$ is arbitrary,

$$U^\dagger (R) \widehat{A}' U(R) = \widehat{A}$$

=== Scalar operators ===
A scalar operator is invariant under rotations:

$$U(R)^\dagger \widehat{S} U(R) = \widehat{S}$$

This is equivalent to saying a scalar operator commutes with the rotation generators:

$$\left[ \widehat{S} , \widehat{\mathbf{J}} \right] = 0$$

Examples of scalar operators include

- the energy operator:
  $$\widehat{E} \psi = i\hbar\frac{\partial}{\partial t} \psi$$
- potential energy V (in the case of a central potential only)
  $$\widehat{V}(r,t) \psi(\mathbf{r},t) = V(r,t) \psi(\mathbf{r},t)$$
- kinetic energy T:
  $$\widehat{T}\psi(\mathbf{r},t) = -\frac{\hbar^2}{2m} (\nabla^2 \psi)(\mathbf{r},t)$$
- the spin–orbit coupling:
  $$\widehat{\mathbf{L}}\cdot\widehat{\mathbf{S}} = \widehat{L}_x \widehat{S}_x + \widehat{L}_y \widehat{S}_y + \widehat{L}_z \widehat{S}_z \,.$$

=== Vector operators ===
Vector operators (as well as pseudovector operators) are a set of 3 operators that can be rotated according to:

$${U(R)}^\dagger \widehat{V}_i U(R) = \sum_j R_{ij} \widehat{V}_j$$
Any observable vector quantity of a quantum mechanical system should be invariant of the choice of frame of reference. The transformation of expectation value vector which applies for any wavefunction, ensures the above equality. In Dirac notation:
$$\langle\bar{\psi}|\widehat{V}_a|\bar{\psi}\rangle = \langle \psi | {U(R)}^\dagger \widehat{V}_a U(R) | \psi \rangle = \sum_b R_{ab} \langle \psi | \widehat{V}_b | \psi \rangle$$
where the RHS is due to the rotation transformation acting on the vector formed by expectation values. Since |Ψ⟩ is any quantum state, the same result follows:
$${U(R)}^\dagger \widehat{V}_a U(R) = \sum_b R_{ab} \widehat{V}_b$$
Note that here, the term "vector" is used two different ways: kets such as |ψ⟩ are elements of abstract Hilbert spaces, while the vector operator is defined as a quantity whose components transform in a certain way under rotations.

From the above relation for infinitesimal rotations and the Baker Hausdorff lemma, by equating coefficients of order $\delta\theta$, one can derive the commutation relation with the rotation generator:

$${ \left[\widehat{V}_a, \widehat{J}_b \right] = \sum_c i \hbar \varepsilon_{abc} \widehat{V}_c}$$
where ε_{ijk} is the Levi-Civita symbol, which all vector operators must satisfy, by construction. The above commutator rule can also be used as an alternative definition for vector operators which can be shown by using the Baker Hausdorff lemma. As the symbol ε_{ijk} is a pseudotensor, pseudovector operators are invariant up to a sign: +1 for proper rotations and −1 for improper rotations.

Since operators can be shown to form a vector operator by their commutation relation with angular momentum components (which are generators of rotation), its examples include:

- the position operator:
  $$\widehat{\mathbf{r}} \psi = \mathbf{r} \psi$$
- the momentum operator:
  $$\widehat{\mathbf{p}} \psi = -i\hbar \nabla \psi$$

and peusodovector operators include

- the orbital angular momentum operator:
  $$\widehat{\mathbf{L}} \psi = -i\hbar \mathbf{r} \times \nabla \psi$$
- as well the spin operator S, and hence the total angular momentum
  $$\widehat{\mathbf{J}} = \widehat{\mathbf{L}}+\widehat{\mathbf{S}}\,.$$

==== Scalar operators from vector operators ====
If $\vec{V}$ and $\vec{W}$ are two vector operators, the dot product between the two vector operators can be defined as:

$\vec{V} \cdot \vec{W} = \sum_{i=1}^3 \hat{V_i} \hat{W_i}$

Under rotation of coordinates, the newly defined operator transforms as:
$${U(R)}^\dagger (\vec{V}\cdot \vec{W}) U(R) =  {U(R)}^\dagger\left(\sum_{i=1}^3 \hat{V_i} \hat{W_i}\right) U(R)= \sum_{i=1}^3({U(R)}^\dagger \hat{V}_i U(R))({U(R)}^\dagger \hat{W}_i U(R))=\sum_{i=1}^3 \left(\sum_{j=1}^3 R_{ij} \widehat{V}_j \cdot \sum_{k=1}^3 R_{ik} \widehat{W}_k \right)$$
Rearranging terms and using transpose of rotation matrix as its inverse property:
$${U(R)}^\dagger (\vec{V}\cdot \vec{W}) U(R) =\sum_{k=1}^3 \sum_{j=1}^3 \left( \sum_{i=1}^3  R_{ji}^T  R_{ik} \right) \widehat{V}_j \widehat{W}_k = \sum_{k=1}^3 \sum_{j=1}^3 \delta_{j,k} \widehat{V}_j \widehat{W}_k = \sum_{i=1}^3 \widehat{V}_i \widehat{W}_i$$
Where the RHS is the $\vec{V} \cdot \vec{W}$ operator originally defined. Since the dot product defined is invariant under rotation transformation, it is said to be a scalar operator.

=== Spherical vector operators ===
A vector operator in the spherical basis is V = (V_{+1}, V_{0}, V_{−1}) where the components are:
$$V_{+1}=-\frac{1}{\sqrt{2}}(V_x + i V_y)\,\quad V_{-1}=\frac{1}{\sqrt{2}}(V_x - i V_y)\,,\quad V_0 = V_z \,,$$
using $J_\pm = J_x \pm i J_y \,,$ the various commutators with the rotation generators and ladder operators are:
$$\begin{align}
\left[J_z, V_{+1}\right] &= +\hbar V_{+1} \\[1ex]
\left[J_z, V_{0}\right] &= 0 V_{0} \\ [1ex]
\left[J_z, V_{-1}\right] &= -\hbar V_{-1} \\ [2ex]
\left[J_+, V_{+1}\right] &= 0 \\[1ex]
\left[J_+, V_{0}\right] &=  \sqrt{2}\hbar V_{+1} \\ [1ex]
\left[J_+, V_{-1}\right] &= \sqrt{2}\hbar V_{0} \\ [2ex]
\left[J_-, V_{+1}\right] &= \sqrt{2}\hbar V_{0} \\[1ex]
\left[J_-, V_{0}\right] &=  \sqrt{2}\hbar V_{-1} \\ [1ex]
\left[J_-, V_{-1}\right] &= 0 \\ [1ex]
\end{align}$$

which are of similar form of
$$\begin{align}
J_z |1,+1 \rangle &= +\hbar |1,+1 \rangle \\[1ex]
J_z|1,0 \rangle &= 0 |1,0 \rangle \\ [1ex]
J_z|1,-1 \rangle &= -\hbar |1,-1 \rangle\\ [2ex]
J_+|1,+1 \rangle &= 0\\[1ex]
J_+|1,0 \rangle &=  \sqrt{2}\hbar |1,+1 \rangle \\ [1ex]
J_+|1, -1\rangle &= \sqrt{2}\hbar |1,0 \rangle\\ [2ex]
J_-|1,+1 \rangle &= \sqrt{2}\hbar |1,0 \rangle\\[1ex]
J_-|1,0 \rangle &=  \sqrt{2}\hbar |1,-1 \rangle \\ [1ex]
J_-|1,-1 \rangle &= 0 \\ [1ex]
\end{align}$$

In the spherical basis, the generators of rotation are:
$$J_{\pm 1} = \mp \frac{1}{\sqrt{2}} J_\pm \,,\quad J_0 = J_z$$

From the transformation of operators and Baker Hausdorff lemma:

${U(R)}^\dagger \widehat{V}_q U(R) = \widehat{V}_q + i\frac{\theta}{\hbar}\left[ \hat{n}\cdot \vec{J}, \widehat{V}_q\right]+\sum_{k=2}^\infty \frac{\left( i\frac{\theta}{\hbar}[\hat{n}\cdot \vec{J}, .]\right)^k}{k!}\widehat{V}_q = \exp\left({ i \frac{\theta}{\hbar} \hat{n}\cdot Ad_{\vec{J}}}\right) \widehat{V}_q$

compared to

$U(R) |j,k \rangle = |j,k \rangle - i\frac{\theta}{\hbar}\hat{n}\cdot \vec{J}|j,k \rangle+\sum_{k=2}^\infty \frac{\left(-i\frac{\theta}{\hbar}\hat{n}\cdot \vec{J}\right)^k}{k!}|j,k \rangle= \exp\left({-i \frac{\theta}{\hbar} \hat{n}\cdot \vec{J}}\right)|j,k \rangle$

it can be argued that the commutator with operator replaces the action of operator on state for transformations of operators as compared with that of states:

$U(R) |j,k \rangle = \exp\left({-i \frac{\theta}{\hbar} \hat{n}\cdot \vec{J}}\right)|j,k \rangle = \sum_{j',k'} |j',k' \rangle \langle j',k' | \exp\left({-i \frac{\theta}{\hbar} \hat{n}\cdot \vec{J}}\right)|j,k \rangle = \sum_{k'} D_{k'k }^{(j)}(R)|j,k'\rangle$

The rotation transformation in the spherical basis (originally written in the Cartesian basis) is then, due to similarity of commutation and operator shown above:
$${U(R)}^\dagger \widehat{V}_q U(R) = \sum_{q'} {{D^{(1)}_{q'q}}(R^{-1})} \widehat{ V}_{q'}$$

One can generalize the vector operator concept easily to tensorial operators, shown next.

=== Tensor operators ===
In general, a tensor operator is one that transforms according to a tensor:
$$U(R)^\dagger \widehat{T}_{pqr\cdots}^{abc\cdots} U(R) = R_{p,\alpha}R_{q,\beta}R_{r,\gamma}\cdots \widehat{T}_{ijk\cdots}^{\alpha \beta \gamma \cdots} R_{i,a}^{-1}R_{j,b}^{-1}R_{k,c}^{-1} \cdots$$
where the basis are transformed by $R^{-1}$ or the vector components transform by $R$.

In the subsequent discussion surrounding tensor operators, the index notation regarding covariant/contravariant behavior is ignored entirely. Instead, contravariant components is implied by context. Hence for an n times contravariant tensor:

$$U(R)^\dagger \widehat{T}_{pqr\cdots} U(R) = R_{pi}R_{qj}R_{rk}\cdots \widehat{T}_{ijk\cdots}$$

==== Examples of tensor operators ====
- The Quadrupole moment operator,
  $$Q_{ij} = \sum_{\alpha}q_{\alpha} (3 r_{\alpha i}r_{\alpha j} - r_{\alpha}^{2} \delta_{ij})$$
- Components of two tensor vector operators can be multiplied to give another tensor operator.
  $$T_{ij} = V_{i} W_{j}$$
  In general, n number of tensor operators will also give another tensor operator
  $$T_{p q r \cdots k} = V_{p}^{(1)} V_{q}^{(2)} V_{r}^{(3)}\cdots V_{k}^{(n)}$$
  or,
  $$T_{i_1 i_2 \cdots j_1 j_2 \cdots} = V_{i_1 i_2\cdots} W_{j_1 j_2 \cdots}$$

Note: In general, a tensor operator cannot be written as the tensor product of other tensor operators as given in the above example.

==== Tensor operator from vector operators ====
If $\vec{V}$ and $\vec{W}$ are two three dimensional vector operators, then a rank 2 Cartesian dyadic tensors can be formed from nine operators of form $\hat{T}_{ij} = \hat{V_i} \hat{W_j}$,
$${U(R)}^\dagger \hat{T}_{ij} U(R) =  {U(R)}^\dagger(\hat{V_i} \hat{W_j}) U(R)= ({U(R)}^\dagger \hat{V}_i U(R))({U(R)}^\dagger \hat{W}_j U(R))= \left(\sum_{l=1}^3 R_{il} \hat{V}_l \cdot \sum_{k=1}^3 R_{jk} \hat{W}_k \right)$$
Rearranging terms, we get:
$${U(R)}^\dagger \hat{T}_{ij} U(R) = \sum_{k=1}^3 \sum_{l=1}^3 \left( R_{il}  R_{jk} \hat{T}_{lk} \right)$$
The RHS of the equation is change of basis equation for twice contravariant tensors where the basis are transformed by $R^{-1}$ or the vector components transform by $R$ which matches transformation of vector operator components. Hence the operator tensor described forms a rank 2 tensor, in tensor representation,
$$\hat{\mathbf{T}} = \vec{V}
\otimes \vec{W}
= (\hat{V}_i \hat{W}_j) (\mathbf{e}_i \otimes \mathbf{e}_j)$$
Similarly, an n-times contravariant tensor operator can be formed similarly by n vector operators.

We observe that the subspace spanned by linear combinations of the rank two tensor components form an invariant subspace, ie. the subspace does not change under rotation since the transformed components itself is a linear combination of the tensor components. However, this subspace is not irreducible ie. it can be further divided into invariant subspaces under rotation. Otherwise, the subspace is called reducible. In other words, there exists specific sets of different linear combinations of the components such that they transforms into a linear combination of the same set under rotation. In the above example, we will show that the 9 independent tensor components can be divided into a set of 1, 3 and 5 combination of operators that each form irreducible invariant subspaces.

=== Irreducible tensor operators ===
The subspace spanned by $\{ \hat{T}_{ i j} \}$ can be divided two subspaces; three independent antisymmetric components $\{ \hat{A}_{ ij} \}$ and six independent symmetric component $\{ \hat{S}_{ ij} \}$, defined as $\hat{A}_{ ij} = \frac{1}{2} (\hat{T}_{ ij}-\hat{T}_{ji})$ and $\hat{S}_{ ij} = \frac{1}{2} (\hat{T}_{ ij}+\hat{T}_{ji})$. Using the $\{ \hat{T}_{ i j} \}$ transformation under rotation formula, it can be shown that both $\{ \hat{A}_{ ij} \}$ and $\{ \hat{S}_{ ij} \}$ are transformed into a linear combination of members of its own sets. Although $\{ \hat{A}_{ ij} \}$ is irreducible, the same cannot be said about $\{ \hat{S}_{ ij} \}$.

The six independent symmetric component set can be divided into five independent traceless symmetric component and the invariant trace can be its own subspace.

Hence, the invariant subspaces of $\{ \hat{T}_{ i j} \}$ are formed respectively by:

1. One invariant trace of the tensor, $\hat{t} = \sum_{k=1}^3\hat{T}_{ kk}$
2. Three linearly independent antisymmetric components from: $\hat{A}_{ ij} = \frac{1}{2} (\hat{T}_{ ij}-\hat{T}_{ji})$
3. Five linearly independent traceless symmetric components from $\hat{S}_{ ij} = \frac{1}{2} (\hat{T}_{ ij}+\hat{T}_{ji}) - \frac{1}{3}\hat{t}\delta_{i j}$

If $\hat{T}_{ij} = \hat{V_i} \hat{W_j}$, the invariant subspaces of $\{ \hat{T}_{ i j} \}$ formed are represented by:

1. One invariant scalar operator $\vec{V} \cdot \vec{W}$
2. Three linearly independent components from $\frac{1}{2} (\hat{V}_{i}\hat{W}_{j}-\hat{V}_{j}\hat{W}_{i})$
3. Five linearly independent components from $\frac{1}{2} (\hat{V}_{i}\hat{W}_{j}+\hat{V}_{j}\hat{W}_{i}) - \frac{1}{3}(\vec{V} \cdot \vec{W})\delta_{i j}$

From the above examples, the nine component $\{ \hat{T}_{ i j} \}$ are split into subspaces formed by one, three and five components. These numbers add up to the number of components of the original tensor in a manner similar to the dimension of vector subspaces adding to the dimension of the space that is a direct sum of these subspaces. Similarly, every element of $\{ \hat{T}_{ i j} \}$ can be expressed in terms of a linear combination of components from its invariant subspaces:

$\hat{T}_{ ij} = \frac{1}{3}\hat{t}\delta_{ij}+\hat{A}_{ij}+\hat{S}_{ij}$

or

$\hat{T}_{ ij} = \frac{1}{3}(\vec{V} \cdot \vec{W})\delta_{ij}+\left( \frac{1}{2} (\hat{V}_{i}\hat{W}_{j}-\hat{V}_{j}\hat{W}_{i}) \right) +\left( \frac{1}{2} (\hat{V}_{i}\hat{W}_{j}+\hat{V}_{j}\hat{W}_{i}) - \frac{1}{3}(\vec{V} \cdot \vec{W})\delta_{i j} \right) = \mathbf{T}^{(0)} + \mathbf{T}^{(1)} + \mathbf{T}^{(2)}$

where:
$$\widehat{T}^{(0)}_{ij} = \frac{\widehat{V}_k \widehat{W}_k}{3}\delta_{ij}$$
$$\widehat{T}^{(1)}_{ij} = \frac{1}{2} \left[\widehat{V}_i \widehat{W}_j - \widehat{V}_j \widehat{W}_i\right] = \widehat{V}_{[i} \widehat{W}_{j]}$$
$$\widehat{T}^{(2)}_{ij} = \tfrac{1}{2} \left(\widehat{V}_i \widehat{W}_j + \widehat{V}_j \widehat{W}_i\right) - \tfrac{1}{3} \widehat{V}_k \widehat{W}_k \delta_{ij} = \widehat{V}_{(i} \widehat{W}_{j)} - T^{(0)}_{ij}$$

In general cartesian tensors of rank greater than 1 are reducible. In quantum mechanics, this particular example bears resemblance to the addition of two spin one particles where both are 3 dimensional, hence the total space being 9 dimensional, can be formed by spin 0, spin 1 and spin 2 systems each having 1 dimensional, 3 dimensional and 5 dimensional space respectively. These three terms are irreducible, which means they cannot be decomposed further and still be tensors satisfying the defining transformation laws under which they must be invariant. Each of the irreducible representations T^{(0)}, T^{(1)}, T^{(2)} ... transform like angular momentum eigenstates according to the number of independent components.

It is possible that a given tensor may have one or more of these components vanish. For example, the quadrupole moment tensor is already symmetric and traceless, and hence has only 5 independent components to begin with.

=== Spherical tensor operators ===
Spherical tensor operators are generally defined as operators with the following transformation rule, under rotation of coordinate system:

$\widehat{T}_m^{(j)} \rightarrow U(R)^\dagger \widehat{T}_m^{(j)} U(R) =\sum_{m'} D_{m'm}^{(j)}(R^{-1})\widehat{T}_{m'}^{(j)}$

The commutation relations can be found by expanding LHS and RHS as:

$U(R)^\dagger \widehat{T}_m^{(j)} U(R) = \left(1+\frac{i\epsilon \hat{n}\cdot \vec{J}}{\hbar} +\mathcal{O}(\epsilon ^2)\right)\widehat{T}_m^{(j)}\left(1-\frac{i\epsilon \hat{n}\cdot \vec{J}}{\hbar} + \mathcal{O}(\epsilon ^2)\right) =\sum_{m'} \langle j,m' |\left( 1+\frac{i\epsilon \hat{n}\cdot \vec{J}}{\hbar} +\mathcal{O}(\epsilon ^2) \right)|j,m\rangle \widehat{T}_{m'}^{(j)}$

Simplifying and applying limits to select only first order terms, we get:

${[\hat{n}\cdot {\vec{J}}},\widehat{T}_m^{(j)}] = \sum_{m'} \widehat{T}_{m'}^{(j)} \langle j, m'|\vec{J}\cdot\hat{n}|j,m\rangle$

For choices of $\hat{n}=\hat{x}\pm i \hat{y}$ or $\hat{n}=\hat{z}$, we get:
$$\begin{align}
\left[ J_\pm , \widehat{T}^{(j)}_{m} \right] &= \hbar \sqrt{( j \mp m )(j \pm m + 1)} \widehat{T}^{(j)}_{m  \pm 1} \\[1ex]
\left[ J_z , \widehat{T}^{(j)}_{m} \right] &= \hbar m \widehat{T}^{(j)}_{m}
\end{align}$$
Note the similarity of the above to:
$$\begin{align}
J_\pm | j,m \rangle &= \hbar \sqrt{( j \mp m )(j \pm m + 1)} | j, m \pm 1 \rangle \\[1ex]
J_z| j,m \rangle &= \hbar m | j,m \rangle
\end{align}$$
Since $J_x$ and $J_y$ are linear combinations of $J_\pm$, they share the same similarity due to linearity.

If, only the commutation relations hold, using the following relation, $|j,m \rangle \rightarrow U(R) |j,m \rangle = \exp\left(-{i \frac{\theta}{\hbar} \hat{n}\cdot \vec{J}}\right)|j,m \rangle=\sum_{m'} D_{m'm}^{(j)}(R)|j,m' \rangle$

we find due to similarity of actions of $J$ on wavefunction $|j,m \rangle$ and the commutation relations on $\widehat{T}_m^{(j)}$, that:

$\widehat{T}_m^{(j)} \rightarrow U(R)^\dagger \widehat{T}_m^{(j)} U(R) = \exp\left({i \frac{\theta}{\hbar} \hat{n}\cdot ad_{\vec{J}}}\right)\widehat{T}_m^{(j)} =\sum_{m'} D_{m'm}^{(j)}(R^{-1})\widehat{T}_{m'}^{(j)}$

where the exponential form is given by Baker–Hausdorff lemma. Hence, the above commutation relations and the transformation property are equivalent definitions of spherical tensor operators. It can also be shown that $\{ ad_{\hat{J}_i} \}$ transform like a vector due to their commutation relation.

In the following section, construction of spherical tensors will be discussed. For example, since example of spherical vector operators is shown, it can be used to construct higher order spherical tensor operators. In general, spherical tensor operators can be constructed from two perspectives. One way is to specify how spherical tensors transform under a physical rotation - a group theoretical definition. A rotated angular momentum eigenstate can be decomposed into a linear combination of the initial eigenstates: the coefficients in the linear combination consist of Wigner rotation matrix entries. Or by continuing the previous example of the second order dyadic tensor T = a ⊗ b, casting each of a and b into the spherical basis and substituting into T gives the spherical tensor operators of the second order.

==== Construction using Clebsch–Gordan coefficients ====
Combination of two spherical tensors $A_{q_1}^{(k_1 )}$ and $B_{q_2}^{(k_2 )}$in the following manner involving the Clebsch–Gordan coefficients can be proved to give another spherical tensor of the form:
$$T_{q}^{(k)} = \sum_{q_1, q_2} \langle k_1 , k_2 ; q_1 , q_2 | k_1 , k_2; k , q \rangle A_{q_1}^{(k_1)} B_{q_2}^{(k_2)}$$

This equation can be used to construct higher order spherical tensor operators, for example, second order spherical tensor operators using two first order spherical tensor operators, say A and B, discussed previously:

$$\begin{align}
\widehat{T}^{(2)}_{\pm 2} &= \widehat{a}_{\pm 1} \widehat{b}_{\pm 1} \\[1ex]
\widehat{T}^{(2)}_{\pm 1} &= \tfrac{1}{\sqrt{2}}\left( \widehat{a}_{\pm 1} \widehat{b}_0 + \widehat{a}_0 \widehat{b}_{\pm 1} \right) \\[1ex]
\widehat{T}^{(2)}_{0} &= \tfrac{1}{\sqrt{6}}\left( \widehat{a}_{+1} \widehat{b}_{-1} + \widehat{a}_{-1} \widehat{b}_{+1} + 2 \widehat{a}_0 \widehat{b}_0 \right)
\end{align}$$

Using the infinitesimal rotation operator and its Hermitian conjugate, one can derive the commutation relation in the spherical basis:
$$\left[J_a, \widehat{T}^{(2)}_{q} \right] = \sum_{q'} {D(J_a)}^{(2)}_{qq'} \widehat{T}_{q'}^{(2)} = \sum_{q'} \langle j {=} 2, m {=} q | J_a | j {=} 2, m {=} q' \rangle \widehat{T}_{q'}^{(2)}$$
and the finite rotation transformation in the spherical basis can be verified:
$${U(R)}^\dagger \widehat{T}^{(2)}_q U(R) = \sum_{q'} {{D(R)}^{(2)}_{qq'}}^* \widehat{T}_{q'}^{(2)}$$

==== Using Spherical Harmonics ====
Define an operator by its spectrum:
$$\Upsilon^m_l|r\rangle= r^l Y^m_l(\theta,\phi)|r\rangle=\Upsilon^m_l(\vec{r})|r\rangle$$
Since for spherical harmonics under rotation:
$$Y_{\ell = k }^{m = q} (\mathbf{n})= \langle \mathbf{n}|k,q\rangle \rightarrow  U(R)^\dagger Y_{\ell = k }^{m = q} (\mathbf{n}) U(R) = Y_{\ell = k }^{m = q} (R\mathbf{n}) = \langle \mathbf{n}|D(R)^\dagger|k,q\rangle = \sum_{q'} D^{(k)}_{q',q}(R^{-1})Y_{\ell = k }^{m = q'} (\mathbf{n})$$
It can also been shown that:
$$\Upsilon^m_l(\vec{r}) \rightarrow U(R)^\dagger \Upsilon^m_l(\vec{r}) U(R) = \sum_{m'} D^{(l)}_{m',m}(R^{-1})\Upsilon_{l}^{m'} (\vec{r})$$
Then $\Upsilon^m_l(\vec{V})$, where $\vec{V}$ is a vector operator, also transforms in the same manner ie, is a spherical tensor operator. The process involves expressing $\Upsilon^m_l(\vec{r})=r^l Y^m_l(\theta,\phi)=\Upsilon^m_l(x,y,z)$ in terms of x, y and z and replacing x, y and z with operators V_{x} V_{y} and V_{z} which from vector operator. The resultant operator is hence a spherical tensor operator $\hat{T}_m^{(l)}$. This may include constant due to normalization from spherical harmonics which is meaningless in context of operators.

The Hermitian adjoint of a spherical tensor may be defined as
$$(T^\dagger)_{q}^{(k)} = (-1)^{k - q} (T^{(k)}_{-q})^\dagger.$$
There is some arbitrariness in the choice of the phase factor: any factor containing (−1)^{±q} will satisfy the commutation relations. The above choice of phase has the advantages of being real and that the tensor product of two commuting Hermitian operators is still Hermitian. Some authors define it with a different sign on q, without the k, or use only the floor of k.

== Angular momentum and spherical harmonics ==
=== Orbital angular momentum and spherical harmonics ===
Orbital angular momentum operators have the ladder operators:

$$L_\pm = L_x \pm i L_y$$

which raise or lower the orbital magnetic quantum number m_{ℓ} by one unit. This has almost exactly the same form as the spherical basis, aside from constant multiplicative factors.

=== Spherical tensor operators and quantum spin ===
Spherical tensors can also be formed from algebraic combinations of the spin operators S_{x}, S_{y}, S_{z}, as matrices, for a spin system with total quantum number j = ℓ + s (and ℓ = 0). Spin operators have the ladder operators:

$$S_\pm = S_x \pm i S_y$$

which raise or lower the spin magnetic quantum number m_{s} by one unit.

== Applications ==
Spherical bases have broad applications in pure and applied mathematics and physical sciences where spherical geometries occur.

=== Dipole radiative transitions in a single-electron atom (alkali) ===
The transition amplitude is proportional to matrix elements of the dipole operator between the initial and final states. We use an electrostatic, spinless model for the atom and we consider the transition from the initial energy level E_{nℓ} to final level E_{n′ℓ′}. These levels are degenerate, since the energy does not depend on the magnetic quantum number m or m′. The wave functions have the form,

$$\psi_{n\ell m}(r,\theta,\phi) = R_{n\ell}(r) Y_{\ell m}(\theta,\phi)$$

The dipole operator is proportional to the position operator of the electron, so we must evaluate matrix elements of the form,

$$\langle n'\ell'm'| \mathbf{r} |n\ell m \rangle$$

where, the initial state is on the right and the final one on the left. The position operator r has three components, and the initial and final levels consist of 2ℓ + 1 and 2ℓ′ + 1 degenerate states, respectively. Therefore if we wish to evaluate the intensity of a spectral line as it would be observed, we really have to evaluate 3(2ℓ′+ 1)(2ℓ+ 1) matrix elements, for example, 3×3×5 = 45 in a 3d → 2p transition. This is actually an exaggeration, as we shall see, because many of the matrix elements vanish, but there are still many non-vanishing matrix elements to be calculated.

A great simplification can be achieved by expressing the components of r, not with respect to the Cartesian basis, but with respect to the spherical basis. First we define,

$$r_{q} = \hat{\mathbf{e}}_{q}\cdot \mathbf{r}$$

Next, by inspecting a table of the Y_{ℓm}′s, we find that for ℓ = 1 we have,

$$\begin{align}
r Y_{11}(\theta,\phi)  &=&&-r \sqrt{\frac{3}{8\pi}}\sin(\theta) e^{i\phi} &=& \sqrt{\frac{3}{4\pi}}\left(-\frac{x+iy}{\sqrt{2}}\right) \\
r Y_{10}(\theta,\phi)  &=&& r \sqrt{\frac{3}{4\pi}}\cos(\theta) &=& \sqrt{\frac{3}{4\pi}}z \\
r Y_{1-1}(\theta,\phi) &=&& r \sqrt{\frac{3}{8\pi}}\sin(\theta) e^{-i\phi} &=& \sqrt{\frac{3}{4\pi}}\left(\frac{x-iy}{\sqrt{2}}\right)
\end{align}$$

where, we have multiplied each Y_{1m} by the radius r. On the right hand side we see the spherical components r_{q} of the position vector r. The results can be summarized by,

$$r Y_{1q}(\theta,\phi) = \sqrt{\frac{3}{4 \pi}} r_{q}$$

for q = 1, 0, −1, where q appears explicitly as a magnetic quantum number. This equation reveals a relationship between vector operators and the angular momentum value ℓ = 1, something we will have more to say about presently. Now the matrix elements become a product of a radial integral times an angular integral,
$$\langle n'\ell'm'|r_{q}|n\ell m \rangle = \left(\int_0^{\infty} r^2 dr R_{n'\ell'}^* (r) r R_{n\ell}(r)\right) \left(\sqrt{\frac{4 \pi}{3}}\int \sin{(\theta)}d\Omega Y_{\ell'm'}^*(\theta,\phi) Y_{1q}(\theta,\phi) Y_{\ell m}(\theta,\phi)\right)$$

We see that all the dependence on the three magnetic quantum numbers (m′,q,m) is contained in the angular part of the integral. Moreover, the angular integral can be evaluated by the three-Y_{ℓm} formula, whereupon it becomes proportional to the Clebsch-Gordan coefficient,

$$\langle \ell'm'|\ell1mq\rangle$$

The radial integral is independent of the three magnetic quantum numbers (m′, q, m), and the trick we have just used does not help us to evaluate it. But it is only one integral, and after it has been done, all the other integrals can be evaluated just by computing or looking up Clebsch–Gordan coefficients.

The selection rule m′ = q + m in the Clebsch–Gordan coefficient means that many of the integrals vanish, so we have exaggerated the total number of integrals that need to be done. But had we worked with the Cartesian components r_{i} of r, this selection rule might not have been obvious. In any case, even with the selection rule, there may still be many nonzero integrals to be done (nine, in the case 3d → 2p). The example we have just given of simplifying the calculation of matrix elements for a dipole transition is really an application of the Wigner–Eckart theorem, which we take up later in these notes.

=== Magnetic resonance ===
The spherical tensor formalism provides a common platform for treating coherence and relaxation in nuclear magnetic resonance. In NMR and EPR, spherical tensor operators are employed to express the quantum dynamics of particle spin, by means of an equation of motion for the density matrix entries, or to formulate dynamics in terms of an equation of motion in Liouville space. The Liouville space equation of motion governs the observable averages of spin variables. When relaxation is formulated using a spherical tensor basis in Liouville space, insight is gained because the relaxation matrix exhibits the cross-relaxation of spin observables directly.

== See also ==
- Wigner–Eckart theorem
- Structure tensor
- Clebsch–Gordan coefficients for SU(3)
