= Rotation operator (quantum mechanics) =

Quantum operator

This article concerns the rotation operator, as it appears in quantum mechanics.

== Quantum mechanical rotations ==
With every physical rotation $R$, we postulate a quantum mechanical rotation operator $\widehat{D}(R) : H\to H$ that is the rule that assigns to each vector in the space $H$ the vector
$$| \alpha \rangle_R = \widehat{D}(R) |\alpha \rangle$$
that is also in $H$. We will show that, in terms of the generators of rotation,
$$\widehat{D} (\mathbf{\hat n},\phi) = \exp \left( -i \phi \frac{\mathbf{\hat n} \cdot \widehat{\mathbf J }}{ \hbar} \right),$$
where $\mathbf{\hat n}$ is the rotation axis, $\widehat{\mathbf{J}}$ is angular momentum operator, and $\hbar$ is the reduced Planck constant.

== The translation operator ==
The rotation operator $\operatorname{R}(z, \theta)$, with the first argument $z$ indicating the rotation axis and the second $\theta$ the rotation angle, can operate through the translation operator $\operatorname{T}(a)$ for infinitesimal rotations as explained below. This is why, it is first shown how the translation operator is acting on a particle at position x (the particle is then in the state $|x\rangle$ according to Quantum Mechanics).

Translation of the particle at position $x$ to position $x + a$: $\operatorname{T}(a)|x\rangle = |x + a\rangle$

Because a translation of 0 does not change the position of the particle, we have (with 1 meaning the identity operator, which does nothing):
$$\operatorname{T}(0) = 1$$
$$\operatorname{T}(a) \operatorname{T}(da)|x\rangle = \operatorname{T}(a)|x + da\rangle = |x + a + da\rangle = \operatorname{T}(a + da)|x\rangle \Rightarrow \operatorname{T}(a) \operatorname{T}(da) = \operatorname{T}(a + da)$$

Taylor development gives:
$$\operatorname{T}(da) = \operatorname{T}(0) + \frac{d\operatorname{T}(0)}{da} da + \cdots = 1 - \frac{i}{\hbar} p_x da$$
with
$$p_x = i \hbar \frac{d\operatorname{T}(0)}{da}$$

From that follows:
$$\operatorname{T}(a + da) = \operatorname{T}(a) \operatorname{T}(da) = \operatorname{T}(a)\left(1 - \frac{i}{\hbar} p_x da\right) \Rightarrow \frac{\operatorname{T}(a + da) - \operatorname{T}(a)}{da} = \frac{d\operatorname{T}}{da} = - \frac{i}{\hbar} p_x \operatorname{T}(a)$$

This is a differential equation with the solution

$$\operatorname{T}(a) = \exp\left(- \frac{i}{\hbar} p_x a\right).$$

Additionally, suppose a Hamiltonian $H$ is independent of the $x$ position. Because the translation operator can be written in terms of $p_x$, and $[p_x,H] = 0$, we know that $[H, \operatorname{T}(a)]=0.$ This result means that linear momentum for the system is conserved.

== In relation to the orbital angular momentum ==
Classically we have for the angular momentum $\mathbf L = \mathbf r \times \mathbf p.$ This is the same in quantum mechanics considering $\mathbf r$ and $\mathbf p$ as operators. Classically, an infinitesimal rotation $dt$ of the vector $\mathbf r = (x,y,z)$ about the $z$-axis to $\mathbf r' = (x',y',z)$ leaving $z$ unchanged can be expressed by the following infinitesimal translations (using Taylor approximation):

$$\begin{align}
x' &= r \cos(t + dt) = x - y \, dt + \cdots \\
y' &= r \sin(t + dt) = y + x \, dt + \cdots
\end{align}$$

From that follows for states:
$$\operatorname{R}(z, dt)|r\rangle = \operatorname{R}(z, dt)|x, y, z\rangle = |x - y \, dt, y + x \, dt, z\rangle = \operatorname{T}_x(-y \, dt) \operatorname{T}_y(x \, dt)|x, y, z\rangle = \operatorname{T}_x(-y \, dt) \operatorname{T}_y(x \, dt) |r\rangle$$

And consequently:
$$\operatorname{R}(z, dt) = \operatorname{T}_x (-y \, dt) \operatorname{T}_y(x \, dt)$$

Using
$$T_k(a) = \exp\left(- \frac{i}{\hbar} p_k a\right)$$
from above with $k = x,y$ and Taylor expansion we get:
$$\operatorname{R}(z,dt)=\exp\left[-\frac{i}{\hbar} \left(x p_y - y p_x\right) dt\right] = \exp\left(-\frac{i}{\hbar} L_z dt\right) = 1-\frac{i}{\hbar}L_z dt + \cdots$$
with $L_z = x p_y - y p_x$ the $z$-component of the angular momentum according to the classical cross product.

To get a rotation for the angle $t$, we construct the following differential equation using the condition $\operatorname{R}(z, 0) = 1$:

$$\begin{align}
&\operatorname{R}(z, t + dt) = \operatorname{R}(z, t) \operatorname{R}(z, dt) \\[1.1ex]
\Rightarrow {} & \frac{d\operatorname{R}}{dt} = \frac{\operatorname{R}(z, t + dt) - \operatorname{R}(z, t)}{dt} = \operatorname{R}(z, t) \frac{\operatorname{R}(z, dt) - 1}{dt} = - \frac{i}{\hbar} L_z \operatorname{R}(z, t) \\[1.1ex]
\Rightarrow {}& \operatorname{R}(z, t) = \exp\left(- \frac{i}{\hbar}\, t \, L_z\right)
\end{align}$$

Similar to the translation operator, if we are given a Hamiltonian $H$ which rotationally symmetric about the $z$-axis, $[L_z,H]=0$ implies $[\operatorname{R}(z,t),H]=0$. This result means that angular momentum is conserved.

For the spin angular momentum about for example the $y$-axis we just replace $L_z$ with $S_y = \frac{\hbar}{2} \sigma_y$ (where $\sigma_y$ is the Pauli Y matrix) and we get the spin rotation operator
$$\operatorname{D}(y, t) = \exp\left(- i \frac{t}{2} \sigma_y\right).$$

== Effect on the spin operator and quantum states ==
Operators can be represented by matrices. From linear algebra one knows that a certain matrix $A$ can be represented in another basis through the transformation
$$A' = P A P^{-1}$$
where $P$ is the basis transformation matrix. If the vectors $b$ respectively $c$ are the z-axis in one basis respectively another, they are perpendicular to the y-axis with a certain angle $t$ between them. The spin operator $S_b$ in the first basis can then be transformed into the spin operator $S_c$ of the other basis through the following transformation:
$$S_c = \operatorname{D}(y, t) S_b \operatorname{D}^{-1}(y, t)$$

From standard quantum mechanics we have the known results $S_b |b+\rangle = \frac{\hbar}{2} |b+\rangle$ and $S_c |c+\rangle = \frac{\hbar}{2} |c+\rangle$ where $|b+\rangle$ and $|c+\rangle$ are the top spins in their corresponding bases. So we have:
$$\frac{\hbar}{2} |c+\rangle = S_c |c+\rangle = \operatorname{D}(y, t) S_b \operatorname{D}^{-1}(y, t) |c+\rangle \Rightarrow$$
$$S_b \operatorname{D}^{-1}(y, t) |c+\rangle = \frac{\hbar}{2} \operatorname{D}^{-1}(y, t) |c+\rangle$$

Comparison with $S_b |b+\rangle = \frac{\hbar}{2} |b+\rangle$ yields $|b+\rangle = D^{-1}(y, t) |c+\rangle$.

This means that if the state $|c+\rangle$ is rotated about the $y$-axis by an angle $t$, it becomes the state $|b+\rangle$, a result that can be generalized to arbitrary axes.

== See also ==
- Symmetry in quantum mechanics
- Spherical basis
- Optical phase space
