= Wigner D-matrix =

Irreducible representation of the rotation group SO

The Wigner D-matrix is a unitary matrix in an irreducible representation of the groups SU(2) and SO(3). It was introduced in 1927 by Eugene Wigner, and plays a fundamental role in the quantum mechanical theory of angular momentum. The complex conjugate of the D-matrix is an eigenfunction of the Hamiltonian of spherical and symmetric rigid rotors. The letter D stands for Darstellung, which means "representation" in German.

== Definition of the Wigner D-matrix ==
Let J_{x}, J_{y}, J_{z} be generators of the Lie algebra of SU(2) and SO(3). In quantum mechanics, these three operators are the components of a vector operator known as angular momentum. Examples are the angular momentum of an electron in an atom, electronic spin, and the angular momentum of a rigid rotor.

In all cases, the three operators satisfy the following commutation relations,

$$[J_x,J_y] = i J_z,\quad [J_z,J_x] = i J_y,\quad [J_y,J_z] = i J_x,$$

where i is the purely imaginary number and the Planck constant ħ has been set equal to one. The Casimir operator

$$J^2 = J_x^2 + J_y^2 + J_z^2$$

commutes with all generators of the Lie algebra. Hence, it may be diagonalized together with J_{z}.

This defines the spherical basis used here. That is, there is a complete set of kets (i.e. orthonormal basis of joint eigenvectors labelled by quantum numbers that define the eigenvalues) with

$$J^2 |jm\rangle = j(j+1) |jm\rangle,\quad J_z |jm\rangle = m |jm\rangle,$$

where j = 0, 1/2, 1, 3/2, 2, ... for SU(2), and j = 0, 1, 2, ... for SO(3). In both cases, m = −j, −j + 1, ..., j.

A 3-dimensional rotation operator can be written as

$$\mathcal{R}(\alpha,\beta,\gamma) = e^{-i\alpha J_z}e^{-i\beta J_y}e^{-i\gamma J_z},$$

where α, β, γ are Euler angles (characterized by the keywords: z-y-z convention, right-handed frame, right-hand screw rule, active interpretation).

The Wigner D-matrix is a unitary square matrix of dimension 2j + 1 in this spherical basis with elements

$$D^j_{m'm}(\alpha,\beta,\gamma) \equiv \langle jm' | \mathcal{R}(\alpha,\beta,\gamma)| jm \rangle =e^{-im'\alpha } d^j_{m'm}(\beta)e^{-i m\gamma},$$

where

$$d^j_{m'm}(\beta)= \langle jm' |e^{-i\beta J_y} | jm \rangle = D^j_{m'm}(0,\beta,0)$$

is an element of the orthogonal Wigner's (small) d-matrix (sometimes referred to as the reduced Wigner D-matrix).

That is, in this basis,

$$D^j_{m'm}(\alpha,0,0) = e^{-im'\alpha } \delta_{m'm}$$

is diagonal, like the γ matrix factor, but unlike the above β factor.

== Wigner (small) d-matrix ==
Wigner gave the following expression:

$$d^j_{m'm}(\beta) =[(j+m')!(j-m')!(j+m)!(j-m)!]^{\frac{1}{2}} \sum_{s=s_{\mathrm{min}}}^{s_{\mathrm{max}}} \left[\frac{(-1)^{m'-m+s} \left(\cos\frac{\beta}{2}\right)^{2j+m-m'-2s}\left(\sin\frac{\beta}{2}\right)^{m'-m+2s}}{(j+m-s)!s!(m'-m+s)!(j-m'-s)!} \right].$$

The sum over s is over such values that the factorials are nonnegative, i.e. $s_{\mathrm{min}}=\mathrm{max}(0,m-m')$, $s_{\mathrm{max}}=\mathrm{min}(j+m,j-m')$.

Note: The d-matrix elements defined here are real. In the often-used z-x-z convention of Euler angles, the factor $(-1)^{m'-m+s}$ in this formula is replaced by $(-1)^s i^{m-m'},$ causing half of the functions to be purely imaginary. The realness of the d-matrix elements is one of the reasons that the z-y-z convention, used in this article, is usually preferred in quantum mechanical applications.

The d-matrix elements are related to Jacobi polynomials $P^{(a,b)}_k(\cos\beta)$ with nonnegative $a$ and $b.$ Let

$$k = \min(j+m, j-m, j+m', j-m').$$

If

$$k = \begin{cases}
j+m:  & a=m'-m;\quad \lambda=m'-m\\
j-m:  & a=m-m';\quad \lambda= 0 \\
j+m': & a=m-m';\quad \lambda= 0 \\
j-m': & a=m'-m;\quad \lambda=m'-m \\
\end{cases}$$

Then, with $b=2j-2k-a,$ the relation is

$$d^j_{m'm}(\beta) = (-1)^{\lambda} \binom{2j-k}{k+a}^{\frac{1}{2}} \binom{k+b}{b}^{-\frac{1}{2}} \left(\sin\frac{\beta}{2}\right)^a \left(\cos\frac{\beta}{2}\right)^b P^{(a,b)}_k(\cos\beta),$$

where $a,b \ge 0.$

It is also useful to consider the relations $a = |m'-m|, b = |m'+m|, \lambda = \frac{m-m'-|m-m'|}{2}, k = j - M$, where $M = \max(|m|,|m'|)$ and $N = \min(|m|,|m'|)$, which lead to:

$$d^j_{m'm}(\beta) =(-1)^{\frac{m-m'-|m-m'|}{2}}\left[ \frac{(j+M)!(j-M)!}{(j+N)!(j-N)!}\right]^{\frac{1}{2}} \left(\sin\frac{\beta}{2}\right)^{|m-m'|} \left(\cos\frac{\beta}{2}\right)^{|m+m'|} P_{j-M}^{(|m-m'|,|m+m'|)}(\cos \beta).$$

== Properties of the Wigner D-matrix ==
The complex conjugate of the D-matrix satisfies a number of differential properties that can be formulated concisely by introducing the following operators with $(x, y, z) = (1, 2, 3),$

$$\begin{align}
\hat{\mathcal{J}}_1 &= i \left( \cos \alpha \cot \beta \frac{\partial}{\partial \alpha} + \sin \alpha {\partial \over \partial \beta} - {\cos \alpha \over \sin \beta} {\partial \over \partial \gamma} \right) \\
\hat{\mathcal{J}}_2 &= i \left( \sin \alpha \cot \beta {\partial \over \partial \alpha} - \cos \alpha {\partial \over \partial \beta} - {\sin \alpha \over \sin \beta} {\partial \over \partial \gamma} \right) \\
\hat{\mathcal{J}}_3 &= - i {\partial \over \partial \alpha}
\end{align}$$

which have quantum mechanical meaning: they are space-fixed rigid rotor angular momentum operators.

Further,

$$\begin{align}
\hat{\mathcal{P}}_1 &= i \left( {\cos \gamma \over \sin \beta}{\partial \over \partial \alpha } - \sin \gamma {\partial \over \partial \beta }- \cot \beta \cos \gamma {\partial \over \partial \gamma} \right)\\
\hat{\mathcal{P}}_2 &= i \left( - {\sin \gamma \over \sin \beta} {\partial \over \partial \alpha} - \cos \gamma
{\partial \over \partial \beta} + \cot \beta \sin \gamma {\partial \over \partial \gamma} \right) \\
\hat{\mathcal{P}}_3 &= - i {\partial\over \partial \gamma}, \\
\end{align}$$

which have quantum mechanical meaning: they are body-fixed rigid rotor angular momentum operators.

The operators satisfy the commutation relations

$$\left[\mathcal{J}_1, \mathcal{J}_2\right] = i \mathcal{J}_3, \qquad \hbox{and}\qquad \left[\mathcal{P}_1, \mathcal{P}_2\right] = -i \mathcal{P}_3,$$

and the corresponding relations with the indices permuted cyclically. The $\mathcal{P}_i$ satisfy anomalous commutation relations (have a minus sign on the right hand side).

The two sets mutually commute,

$$\left[\mathcal{P}_i, \mathcal{J}_j\right] = 0,\quad i, j = 1, 2, 3,$$

and the total operators squared are equal,

$$\mathcal{J}^2 \equiv \mathcal{J}_1^2+ \mathcal{J}_2^2 + \mathcal{J}_3^2 = \mathcal{P}^2 \equiv \mathcal{P}_1^2+ \mathcal{P}_2^2 + \mathcal{P}_3^2.$$

Their explicit form is,

$$\mathcal{J}^2= \mathcal{P}^2 =-\frac{1}{\sin^2\beta} \left( \frac{\partial^2}{\partial \alpha^2} +\frac{\partial^2}{\partial \gamma^2} -2\cos\beta\frac{\partial^2}{\partial\alpha\partial \gamma} \right)-\frac{\partial^2}{\partial \beta^2} -\cot\beta\frac{\partial}{\partial \beta}.$$

The operators $\mathcal{J}_i$ act on the first (row) index of the D-matrix,

$$\begin{align}
\mathcal{J}_3 D^j_{m'm}(\alpha,\beta,\gamma)^* &=m' D^j_{m'm}(\alpha,\beta,\gamma)^*  \\
(\mathcal{J}_1 \pm i \mathcal{J}_2) D^j_{m'm}(\alpha,\beta,\gamma)^* &= \sqrt{j(j+1)-m'(m'\pm 1)} D^j_{m'\pm 1, m}(\alpha,\beta,\gamma)^*
\end{align}$$

The operators $\mathcal{P}_i$ act on the second (column) index of the D-matrix,

$$\mathcal{P}_3 D^j_{m'm}(\alpha,\beta,\gamma)^* = m D^j_{m'm}(\alpha,\beta,\gamma)^* ,$$

and, because of the anomalous commutation relation the raising/lowering operators are defined with reversed signs,

$$(\mathcal{P}_1 \mp i \mathcal{P}_2) D^j_{m'm}(\alpha,\beta,\gamma)^* = \sqrt{j(j+1)-m(m\pm 1)} D^j_{m', m\pm1}(\alpha,\beta,\gamma)^* .$$

Finally,

$$\mathcal{J}^2 D^j_{m'm}(\alpha,\beta,\gamma)^* =\mathcal{P}^2 D^j_{m'm}(\alpha,\beta,\gamma)^* = j(j+1) D^j_{m'm}(\alpha,\beta,\gamma)^*.$$

In other words, the rows and columns of the (complex conjugate) Wigner D-matrix span irreducible representations of the isomorphic Lie algebras generated by $\{\mathcal{J}_i\}$ and $\{-\mathcal{P}_i\}$.

An important property of the Wigner D-matrix follows from the commutation of $\mathcal{R}(\alpha,\beta,\gamma)$ with the time reversal operator T,

$$\langle jm' | \mathcal{R}(\alpha,\beta,\gamma)| jm \rangle = \langle jm' | T^{ \dagger} \mathcal{R}(\alpha,\beta,\gamma) T| jm \rangle =(-1)^{m'-m} \langle j,-m' | \mathcal{R}(\alpha,\beta,\gamma)| j,-m \rangle^*,$$

or

$$D^j_{m'm}(\alpha,\beta,\gamma) = (-1)^{m'-m} D^j_{-m',-m}(\alpha,\beta,\gamma)^*.$$

Here, we used that $T$ is anti-unitary (hence the complex conjugation after moving $T^\dagger$ from ket to bra), $T | jm \rangle = (-1)^{j-m} | j,-m \rangle$ and $(-1)^{2j-m'-m} = (-1)^{m'-m}$.

A further symmetry implies

$$(-1)^{m'-m}D^{j}_{mm'}(\alpha,\beta,\gamma)=D^{j}_{m'm}(\gamma,\beta,\alpha)~.$$

== Orthogonality relations ==
The Wigner D-matrix elements $D^j_{mk}(\alpha,\beta,\gamma)$ form a set of orthogonal functions of the Euler angles $\alpha, \beta,$ and $\gamma$:

$$\int_0^{2\pi} d\alpha \int_0^\pi d\beta \sin \beta \int_0^{2\pi} d\gamma \,\, D^{j'}_{m'k'}(\alpha,\beta,\gamma)^\ast D^j_{mk}(\alpha, \beta, \gamma) = \frac{8\pi^2}{2j+1} \delta_{m'm}\delta_{k'k}\delta_{j'j}.$$

This is a special case of the Schur orthogonality relations.

Crucially, by the Peter–Weyl theorem, they further form a complete set.

The fact that $D^j_{mk}(\alpha,\beta,\gamma)$ are matrix elements of a unitary transformation from one spherical basis $| lm \rangle$ to another $\mathcal{R}(\alpha,\beta,\gamma) | lm \rangle$ is represented by the relations:

$$\sum_k   D^j_{m'k}(\alpha, \beta, \gamma)^* D^j_{mk}(\alpha, \beta, \gamma)  = \delta_{m,m'},$$
$$\sum_k   D^j_{k m'}(\alpha, \beta, \gamma)^* D^j_{km}(\alpha, \beta, \gamma)  = \delta_{m,m'}.$$

The group characters for SU(2) only depend on the rotation angle β, being class functions, so, then, independent of the axes of rotation,

$$\chi^j (\beta)\equiv \sum_m D^j_{mm}(\beta)=\sum_m d^j_{mm}(\beta) = \frac{\sin\left (\frac{(2j+1)\beta}{2} \right )}{\sin \left (\frac{\beta}{2} \right )},$$

and consequently satisfy simpler orthogonality relations, through the Haar measure of the group,

$$\frac{1}{\pi} \int _0^{2\pi} d\beta \sin^2 \left (\frac{\beta}{2} \right )  \chi^j (\beta)  \chi^{j'}(\beta)=  \delta_{j'j}.$$

The completeness relation is (cf. Eq. (3.95) in ref., or Eq. (4.10.7) in ref.)

$$\sum_j \chi^j (\beta) \chi^j (\beta')= \delta (\beta -\beta'),$$

whence, for $\beta' =0,$

$$\sum_j \chi^j (\beta) (2j+1)= \delta (\beta ).$$

== Kronecker product of Wigner D-matrices, Clebsch–Gordan series ==
The set of Kronecker product matrices

$$\mathbf{D}^j(\alpha,\beta,\gamma)\otimes \mathbf{D}^{j'}(\alpha,\beta,\gamma)$$

forms a reducible matrix representation of the groups SO(3) and SU(2). Reduction into irreducible components is by the following equation:

$$D^j_{m k}(\alpha,\beta,\gamma) D^{j'}_{m' k'}(\alpha,\beta,\gamma) =
\sum_{J=|j-j'|}^{j+j'}  \langle j m j' m' | J \left(m + m'\right) \rangle
\langle j k j' k' | J \left(k + k'\right) \rangle
D^J_{\left(m + m'\right) \left(k + k'\right)}(\alpha,\beta,\gamma)$$

The symbol $\langle j_1 m_1 j_2 m_2 | j_3 m_3 \rangle$ is a Clebsch–Gordan coefficient.

== Relation to spherical harmonics and Legendre polynomials ==
For integer values of $l$, the D-matrix elements with second index equal to zero are proportional to spherical harmonics and associated Legendre polynomials, normalized to unity and with Condon and Shortley phase convention:

$$D^{\ell}_{m 0}(\alpha,\beta,\gamma) = \sqrt{\frac{4\pi}{2\ell+1}} Y_{\ell}^{m*} (\beta, \alpha ) = \sqrt{\frac{(\ell-m)!}{(\ell+m)!}}  \, P_\ell^m ( \cos{\beta} ) \, e^{-i m \alpha }.$$

This implies the following relationship for the d-matrix:

$$d^{\ell}_{m 0}(\beta) = \sqrt{\frac{(\ell-m)!}{(\ell+m)!}}  \, P_\ell^m ( \cos{\beta} ).$$

A rotation of spherical harmonics $\langle \theta, \phi| \ell m'\rangle$ then is effectively a composition of two rotations,

$$\sum^\ell_{m'=-\ell} Y_{\ell}^ {m'} (\theta, \phi )  ~ D^{\ell}_{m' ~m }(\alpha,\beta,\gamma).$$

When both indices are set to zero, the Wigner D-matrix elements are given by ordinary Legendre polynomials:

$$D^{\ell}_{0,0}(\alpha,\beta,\gamma) = d^{\ell}_{0,0}(\beta) = P_{\ell}(\cos\beta).$$

In the present convention of Euler angles, $\alpha$ is a longitudinal angle and $\beta$ is a colatitudinal angle (spherical polar angles in the physical definition of such angles). This is one of the reasons that the z-y-z convention is used frequently in molecular physics. From the time-reversal property of the Wigner D-matrix follows immediately

$$\left( Y_{\ell}^m \right) ^* = (-1)^m Y_{\ell}^{-m}.$$

There exists a more general relationship to the spin-weighted spherical harmonics:

$D^{\ell}_{m s}(\alpha,\beta,-\gamma) =(-1)^s \sqrt\frac{4\pi}{2{\ell}+1} {}_sY_{\ell}^m(\beta,\alpha) e^{is\gamma}.$

== Connection with transition probability under rotations ==
The absolute square of an element of the D-matrix,

$$F_{mm'}(\beta) = | D^j_{mm'}(\alpha,\beta,\gamma) |^2,$$

gives the probability that a system with spin $j$ prepared in a state with spin projection $m$ along some direction will be measured to have a spin projection $m'$ along a second direction at an angle $\beta$ to the first direction. The set of quantities $F_{mm'}$ itself forms a real symmetric matrix, that depends only on the Euler angle $\beta$, as indicated.

Remarkably, the eigenvalue problem for the $F$ matrix can be solved completely:

$$\sum_{m' = -j}^j F_{mm'}(\beta) f^j_{\ell}(m') = P_{\ell}(\cos\beta) f^j_{\ell}(m) \qquad (\ell = 0, 1, \ldots, 2j).$$

Here, the eigenvector, $f^j_{\ell}(m)$, is a scaled and shifted discrete Chebyshev polynomial, and the corresponding eigenvalue, $P_{\ell}(\cos\beta)$, is the Legendre polynomial.

== Relation to Bessel functions ==
In the limit when $\ell \gg m, m^\prime$, one obtains

$$D^\ell_{mm'}(\alpha,\beta,\gamma) \approx e^{-im\alpha-im'\gamma}J_{m-m'}(\ell\beta)$$

where $J_{m-m'}(\ell\beta)$ is the Bessel function and $\ell\beta$ is finite.

== List of d-matrix elements ==
Using sign convention of Wigner, et al. the d-matrix elements $d^j_{m'm}(\theta)$ for j = 1/2, 1, 3/2, and 2 are given below.

For j = 1/2

$$\begin{align}
d_{\frac{1}{2},\frac{1}{2}}^{\frac{1}{2}} &= \cos \frac{\theta}{2} \\[6pt]
d_{\frac{1}{2},-\frac{1}{2}}^{\frac{1}{2}} &= -\sin \frac{\theta}{2}
\end{align}$$

For j = 1

$$\begin{align}
d_{1,1}^{1}  &= \frac{1}{2} (1+\cos \theta) \\[6pt]
d_{1,0}^{1}  &= -\frac{1}{\sqrt{2}} \sin \theta \\[6pt]
d_{1,-1}^{1} &= \frac{1}{2} (1-\cos \theta) \\[6pt]
d_{0,0}^{1}  &= \cos \theta
\end{align}$$

For j = 3/2

$$\begin{align}
d_{\frac{3}{2}, \frac{3}{2}}^{\frac{3}{2}} &=  \frac{1}{2} (1+\cos \theta) \cos \frac{\theta}{2} \\[6pt]
d_{\frac{3}{2}, \frac{1}{2}}^{\frac{3}{2}} &= -\frac{\sqrt{3}}{2} (1+\cos \theta) \sin \frac{\theta}{2} \\[6pt]
d_{\frac{3}{2},-\frac{1}{2}}^{\frac{3}{2}} &=  \frac{\sqrt{3}}{2} (1-\cos \theta) \cos \frac{\theta}{2} \\[6pt]
d_{\frac{3}{2},-\frac{3}{2}}^{\frac{3}{2}} &= -\frac{1}{2} (1-\cos \theta) \sin \frac{\theta}{2} \\[6pt]
d_{\frac{1}{2}, \frac{1}{2}}^{\frac{3}{2}} &=  \frac{1}{2} (3\cos \theta - 1) \cos \frac{\theta}{2} \\[6pt]
d_{\frac{1}{2},-\frac{1}{2}}^{\frac{3}{2}} &= -\frac{1}{2} (3\cos \theta + 1) \sin \frac{\theta}{2}
\end{align}$$

For j = 2

$$\begin{align}
d_{2,2}^{2}  &= \frac{1}{4}\left(1 +\cos \theta\right)^2  \\[6pt]
d_{2,1}^{2}  &= -\frac{1}{2}\sin \theta \left(1 + \cos \theta\right)  \\[6pt]
d_{2,0}^{2}  &= \sqrt{\frac{3}{8}}\sin^2 \theta  \\[6pt]
d_{2,-1}^{2} &= -\frac{1}{2}\sin \theta \left(1 - \cos \theta\right)  \\[6pt]
d_{2,-2}^{2} &= \frac{1}{4}\left(1 -\cos \theta\right)^2  \\[6pt]
d_{1,1}^{2}  &= \frac{1}{2}\left(2\cos^2\theta + \cos \theta-1 \right) \\[6pt]
d_{1,0}^{2}  &= -\sqrt{\frac{3}{8}} \sin 2 \theta  \\[6pt]
d_{1,-1}^{2} &= \frac{1}{2}\left(- 2\cos^2\theta + \cos \theta +1 \right)  \\[6pt]
d_{0,0}^{2}  &= \frac{1}{2} \left(3 \cos^2 \theta - 1\right)
\end{align}$$

Wigner d-matrix elements with swapped lower indices are found with the relation:

$$d_{m', m}^j = (-1)^{m-m'}d_{m, m'}^j = d_{-m,-m'}^j.$$

== Symmetries and special cases ==
$$\begin{align}
d_{m',m}^{j}(\pi)        &= (-1)^{j-m}  \delta_{m',-m} \\[6pt]
d_{m',m}^{j}(\pi-\beta)  &= (-1)^{j+m'}  d_{m',-m}^{j}(\beta)\\[6pt]
d_{m',m}^{j}(\pi+\beta)  &= (-1)^{j-m}  d_{m',-m}^{j}(\beta)\\[6pt]
d_{m',m}^{j}(2\pi+\beta) &= (-1)^{2j}    d_{m',m}^{j}(\beta)\\[6pt]
d_{m',m}^{j}(-\beta)     &= d_{m,m'}^{j}(\beta) = (-1)^{m'-m} d_{m',m}^{j}(\beta)
\end{align}$$

== See also ==
- Clebsch–Gordan coefficients
- Tensor operator
- Symmetries in quantum mechanics
