= Radical polynomial =

Abstract algebra polynominal in mathematics

In mathematics, in the realm of abstract algebra, a radical polynomial is a multivariate polynomial over a field that can be expressed as a polynomial in the sum of squares of the variables. That is, if

$$k[x_1, x_2,\ldots, x_n]$$

is a polynomial ring, the ring of radical polynomials is the subring generated by the polynomial

$$\sum_{i=1}^n x_i^2.$$

Radical polynomials are characterized as precisely those polynomials that are invariant under the action of the orthogonal group.

The ring of radical polynomials is a graded subalgebra of the ring of all polynomials.

The standard separation of variables theorem asserts that every polynomial can be expressed as a finite sum of terms, each term being a product of a radical polynomial and a harmonic polynomial. This is equivalent to the statement that the ring of all polynomials is a free module over the ring of radical polynomials.
