= Table of spherical harmonics =

This is a table of orthonormalized spherical harmonics that employ the Condon-Shortley phase up to degree $\ell = 10$. Some of these formulas are expressed in terms of the Cartesian expansion of the spherical harmonics into polynomials in x, y, z, and r. For purposes of this table, it is useful to express the usual spherical to Cartesian transformations that relate these Cartesian components to $\theta$ and $\varphi$ as

$$\begin{cases}
\cos(\theta) & =  z/r\\
e^{\pm i\varphi} \cdot \sin(\theta) & = (x \pm iy)/r
\end{cases}$$

== Complex spherical harmonics ==
For ℓ = 0, …, 5, see.

=== ℓ = 0 ===
$$Y_{0}^{0}(\theta,\varphi)={1\over 2}\sqrt{1\over \pi}$$

=== ℓ = 1 ===
$$\begin{align}
Y_{1}^{-1}(\theta,\varphi) &= & & {1\over 2}\sqrt{3\over 2\pi}\cdot \mathrm e^{-i\varphi}\cdot\sin\theta & &= & &{1\over 2}\sqrt{3\over 2\pi} \cdot{(x-iy)\over r} \\
Y_{1}^{ 0}(\theta,\varphi) &= & & {1\over 2}\sqrt{3\over  \pi}\cdot                   \cos\theta & &= & &{1\over 2}\sqrt{3\over  \pi} \cdot{z\over r} \\
Y_{1}^{ 1}(\theta,\varphi) &= &-& {1\over 2}\sqrt{3\over 2\pi}\cdot \mathrm e^{i\varphi}\cdot \sin\theta & &= &-&{1\over 2}\sqrt{3\over 2\pi} \cdot{(x+iy)\over r}
\end{align}$$

=== ℓ = 2 ===
$$\begin{align}
Y_{2}^{-2}(\theta,\varphi)&=& &{1\over 4}\sqrt{15\over 2\pi}\cdot \mathrm e^{-2i\varphi}\cdot\sin^{2}\theta\quad                        &&=& &{1\over 4}\sqrt{15\over 2\pi}\cdot{(x - iy)^2 \over r^{2}}&\\
Y_{2}^{-1}(\theta,\varphi)&=& &{1\over 2}\sqrt{15\over 2\pi}\cdot \mathrm e^{-i\varphi}\cdot\sin    \theta\cdot  \cos\theta\quad       &&=& &{1\over 2}\sqrt{15\over 2\pi}\cdot{(x - iy) \cdot z \over r^{2}}&\\
Y_{2}^{ 0}(\theta,\varphi)&=& &{1\over 4}\sqrt{ 5\over  \pi}\cdot                                       (3\cos^{2}\theta-1)\quad&&=& &{1\over 4}\sqrt{ 5\over  \pi}\cdot{(3z^{2}-r^{2})\over r^{2}}&\\
Y_{2}^{ 1}(\theta,\varphi)&=&-&{1\over 2}\sqrt{15\over 2\pi}\cdot \mathrm e^{  i\varphi}\cdot\sin    \theta\cdot  \cos\theta\quad       &&=&-&{1\over 2}\sqrt{15\over 2\pi}\cdot{(x + iy) \cdot z \over r^{2}}&\\
Y_{2}^{ 2}(\theta,\varphi)&=& &{1\over 4}\sqrt{15\over 2\pi}\cdot \mathrm e^{ 2i\varphi}\cdot\sin^{2}\theta\quad                        &&=& &{1\over 4}\sqrt{15\over 2\pi}\cdot{(x + iy)^2 \over r^{2}}&
\end{align}$$

=== ℓ = 3 ===
$$\begin{align}
Y_{3}^{-3}(\theta,\varphi)
&=& &{1\over 8}\sqrt{ 35\over  \pi}\cdot \mathrm e^{-3i\varphi}\cdot\sin^{3}\theta\quad&
&=& & {1\over 8}\sqrt{35\over \pi}\cdot{(x - iy)^{3}\over r^{3}}&\\
Y_{3}^{-2}(\theta,\varphi)
&=& &{1\over 4}\sqrt{105\over 2\pi}\cdot \mathrm e^{-2i\varphi}\cdot\sin^{2}\theta\cdot\cos\theta\quad&
&=& & {1\over 4}\sqrt{105\over 2\pi}\cdot{(x- iy)^2 \cdot  z \over r^{3}}&\\
Y_{3}^{-1}(\theta,\varphi)
&=& &{1\over 8}\sqrt{ 21\over  \pi}\cdot \mathrm e^{-i\varphi}\cdot\sin\theta\cdot(5\cos^{2}\theta-1)\quad&
&=& &{1\over 8}\sqrt{21\over \pi}\cdot{(x - iy) \cdot (5z^2- r^2)\over r^{3}}&\\
Y_{3}^{ 0}(\theta,\varphi)
&=& &{1\over 4}\sqrt{  7\over  \pi}\cdot(5\cos^{3}\theta-3\cos\theta)\quad&
&=& &{1\over 4}\sqrt{7\over \pi}\cdot{(5z^3 - 3zr^2)\over r^{3}}&\\
Y_{3}^{ 1}(\theta,\varphi)
&=&-&{1\over 8}\sqrt{ 21\over  \pi}\cdot \mathrm e^ { i\varphi}\cdot\sin\theta\cdot(5\cos^{2}\theta-1)\quad&
&=& &{-1\over 8}\sqrt{21\over \pi}\cdot{(x + iy) \cdot (5z^2 - r^2) \over r^{3}}&\\
Y_{3}^{ 2}(\theta,\varphi)
&=& &{1\over 4}\sqrt{105\over 2\pi}\cdot \mathrm e^ {2i\varphi}\cdot\sin^{2}\theta\cdot\cos\theta\quad&
&=& &{1\over 4}\sqrt{105\over 2\pi}\cdot{(x + iy)^2 \cdot z \over r^{3}}&\\
Y_{3}^{ 3}(\theta,\varphi)
&=&-&{1\over 8}\sqrt{ 35\over  \pi}\cdot \mathrm e^ {3i\varphi}\cdot\sin^{3}\theta\quad&
&=& &{-1\over 8}\sqrt{35\over \pi}\cdot{(x + iy)^3\over r^{3}}&
\end{align}$$

=== ℓ = 4 ===
$$\begin{align}
Y_{4}^{-4}(\theta,\varphi) &=& &{ 3\over 16} \sqrt{35\over 2\pi} \cdot \mathrm e^{-4i\varphi}\cdot\sin^{4}\theta                               & &=& & \frac{3}{16} \sqrt{\frac{35}{2 \pi}} \cdot \frac{(x - i y)^4}{r^4} \\
Y_{4}^{-3}(\theta,\varphi) &=& &{ 3\over  8} \sqrt{35\over  \pi} \cdot \mathrm e^{-3i\varphi}\cdot\sin^{3}\theta\cdot\cos\theta                & &=& & \frac{3}{8} \sqrt{\frac{35}{\pi}} \cdot \frac{(x - i y)^3 z}{r^4} \\
Y_{4}^{-2}(\theta,\varphi) &=& &{ 3\over  8} \sqrt{ 5\over 2\pi} \cdot \mathrm e^{-2i\varphi}\cdot\sin^{2}\theta\cdot(7\cos^{2}\theta-1)       & &=& & \frac{3}{8} \sqrt{\frac{5}{2 \pi}} \cdot \frac{(x - i y)^2 \cdot (7 z^2 - r^2)}{r^4} \\
Y_{4}^{-1}(\theta,\varphi) &=& &{ 3\over  8} \sqrt{ 5\over  \pi} \cdot \mathrm e^{- i\varphi}\cdot\sin\theta\cdot(7\cos^{3}\theta-3\cos\theta) & &=& & \frac{3}{8} \sqrt{\frac{5}{\pi}} \cdot \frac{(x - i y) \cdot (7 z^3 - 3 z r^2)}{r^4} \\
Y_{4}^{ 0}(\theta,\varphi) &=& &{ 3\over 16} \sqrt{ 1\over  \pi} \cdot(35\cos^{4}\theta-30\cos^{2}\theta+3)                            & &=& & \frac{3}{16} \sqrt{\frac{1}{\pi}} \cdot \frac{(35 z^4 - 30 z^2 r^2 + 3 r^4)}{r^4}\\
Y_{4}^{ 1}(\theta,\varphi) &=& &{-3\over  8} \sqrt{ 5\over  \pi} \cdot \mathrm e^{  i\varphi}\cdot\sin\theta\cdot(7\cos^{3}\theta-3\cos\theta) & &=& & \frac{- 3}{8} \sqrt{\frac{5}{\pi}} \cdot \frac{(x + i y) \cdot (7 z^3 - 3 z r^2)}{r^4}\\
Y_{4}^{ 2}(\theta,\varphi) &=& &{ 3\over  8} \sqrt{ 5\over 2\pi} \cdot \mathrm e^{ 2i\varphi}\cdot\sin^{2}\theta\cdot(7\cos^{2}\theta-1)       & &=& & \frac{3}{8} \sqrt{\frac{5}{2 \pi}} \cdot \frac{(x + i y)^2 \cdot (7 z^2 - r^2)}{r^4}\\
Y_{4}^{ 3}(\theta,\varphi) &=& &{-3\over  8} \sqrt{35\over  \pi} \cdot \mathrm e^{ 3i\varphi}\cdot\sin^{3}\theta\cdot\cos\theta                & &=& & \frac{- 3}{8} \sqrt{\frac{35}{\pi}} \cdot \frac{(x + i y)^3 z}{r^4}\\
Y_{4}^{ 4}(\theta,\varphi) &=& &{ 3\over 16} \sqrt{35\over 2\pi} \cdot \mathrm e^{ 4i\varphi}\cdot\sin^{4}\theta                               & &=& & \frac{3}{16} \sqrt{\frac{35}{2 \pi}} \cdot \frac{(x + i y)^4}{r^4}
\end{align}$$

=== ℓ = 5 ===
$$\begin{align}
Y_{5}^{-5}(\theta,\varphi)&={ 3\over 32}\sqrt{  77\over  \pi}\cdot \mathrm e^{-5i\varphi}\cdot\sin^{5}\theta\\
Y_{5}^{-4}(\theta,\varphi)&={ 3\over 16}\sqrt{ 385\over 2\pi}\cdot \mathrm e^{-4i\varphi}\cdot\sin^{4}\theta\cdot\cos\theta\\
Y_{5}^{-3}(\theta,\varphi)&={ 1\over 32}\sqrt{ 385\over  \pi}\cdot \mathrm e^{-3i\varphi}\cdot\sin^{3}\theta\cdot(9\cos^{2}\theta-1)\\
Y_{5}^{-2}(\theta,\varphi)&={ 1\over  8}\sqrt{1155\over 2\pi}\cdot \mathrm e^{-2i\varphi}\cdot\sin^{2}\theta\cdot(3\cos^{3}\theta-\cos\theta)\\
Y_{5}^{-1}(\theta,\varphi)&={ 1\over 16}\sqrt{ 165\over 2\pi}\cdot \mathrm e^{- i\varphi}\cdot\sin    \theta\cdot(21\cos^{4}\theta-14\cos^{2}\theta+1)\\
Y_{5}^{ 0}(\theta,\varphi)&={ 1\over 16}\sqrt{  11\over  \pi}\cdot                                       (63\cos^{5}\theta-70\cos^{3}\theta+15\cos\theta)\\
Y_{5}^{ 1}(\theta,\varphi)&={-1\over 16}\sqrt{ 165\over 2\pi}\cdot \mathrm e^{  i\varphi}\cdot\sin    \theta\cdot(21\cos^{4}\theta-14\cos^{2}\theta+1)\\
Y_{5}^{ 2}(\theta,\varphi)&={ 1\over  8}\sqrt{1155\over 2\pi}\cdot \mathrm e^{ 2i\varphi}\cdot\sin^{2}\theta\cdot(3\cos^{3}\theta-\cos\theta)\\
Y_{5}^{ 3}(\theta,\varphi)&={-1\over 32}\sqrt{ 385\over  \pi}\cdot \mathrm e^{ 3i\varphi}\cdot\sin^{3}\theta\cdot(9\cos^{2}\theta-1)\\
Y_{5}^{ 4}(\theta,\varphi)&={ 3\over 16}\sqrt{ 385\over 2\pi}\cdot \mathrm e^{ 4i\varphi}\cdot\sin^{4}\theta\cdot\cos\theta\\
Y_{5}^{ 5}(\theta,\varphi)&={-3\over 32}\sqrt{  77\over  \pi}\cdot \mathrm e^{ 5i\varphi}\cdot\sin^{5}\theta
\end{align}$$

=== ℓ = 6 ===
$$\begin{align}
Y_{6}^{-6}(\theta,\varphi)&= {1\over 64}\sqrt{3003\over  \pi}\cdot \mathrm e^{-6i\varphi}\cdot\sin^{6}\theta\\
Y_{6}^{-5}(\theta,\varphi)&= {3\over 32}\sqrt{1001\over  \pi}\cdot \mathrm e^{-5i\varphi}\cdot\sin^{5}\theta\cdot\cos\theta\\
Y_{6}^{-4}(\theta,\varphi)&= {3\over 32}\sqrt{  91\over 2\pi}\cdot \mathrm e^{-4i\varphi}\cdot\sin^{4}\theta\cdot(11\cos^{2}\theta-1)\\
Y_{6}^{-3}(\theta,\varphi)&= {1\over 32}\sqrt{1365\over  \pi}\cdot \mathrm e^{-3i\varphi}\cdot\sin^{3}\theta\cdot(11\cos^{3}\theta-3\cos\theta)\\
Y_{6}^{-2}(\theta,\varphi)&= {1\over 64}\sqrt{1365\over  \pi}\cdot \mathrm e^{-2i\varphi}\cdot\sin^{2}\theta\cdot(33\cos^{4}\theta-18\cos^{2}\theta+1)\\
Y_{6}^{-1}(\theta,\varphi)&= {1\over 16}\sqrt{ 273\over 2\pi}\cdot \mathrm e^{- i\varphi}\cdot\sin    \theta\cdot(33\cos^{5}\theta-30\cos^{3}\theta+5\cos\theta)\\
Y_{6}^{ 0}(\theta,\varphi)&= {1\over 32}\sqrt{  13\over  \pi}\cdot                                       (231\cos^{6}\theta-315\cos^{4}\theta+105\cos^{2}\theta-5)\\
Y_{6}^{ 1}(\theta,\varphi)&=-{1\over 16}\sqrt{ 273\over 2\pi}\cdot \mathrm e^{  i\varphi}\cdot\sin    \theta\cdot(33\cos^{5}\theta-30\cos^{3}\theta+5\cos\theta)\\
Y_{6}^{ 2}(\theta,\varphi)&= {1\over 64}\sqrt{1365\over  \pi}\cdot \mathrm e^{ 2i\varphi}\cdot\sin^{2}\theta\cdot(33\cos^{4}\theta-18\cos^{2}\theta+1)\\
Y_{6}^{ 3}(\theta,\varphi)&=-{1\over 32}\sqrt{1365\over  \pi}\cdot \mathrm e^{ 3i\varphi}\cdot\sin^{3}\theta\cdot(11\cos^{3}\theta-3\cos\theta)\\
Y_{6}^{ 4}(\theta,\varphi)&= {3\over 32}\sqrt{  91\over 2\pi}\cdot \mathrm e^{ 4i\varphi}\cdot\sin^{4}\theta\cdot(11\cos^{2}\theta-1)\\
Y_{6}^{ 5}(\theta,\varphi)&=-{3\over 32}\sqrt{1001\over  \pi}\cdot \mathrm e^{ 5i\varphi}\cdot\sin^{5}\theta\cdot\cos\theta\\
Y_{6}^{ 6}(\theta,\varphi)&= {1\over 64}\sqrt{3003\over  \pi}\cdot \mathrm e^{ 6i\varphi}\cdot\sin^{6}\theta
\end{align}$$

=== ℓ = 7 ===
$$\begin{align}
Y_{7}^{-7}(\theta,\varphi)&= {3\over 64}\sqrt{ 715\over 2\pi}\cdot \mathrm e^{-7i\varphi}\cdot\sin^{7}\theta\\
Y_{7}^{-6}(\theta,\varphi)&= {3\over 64}\sqrt{5005\over  \pi}\cdot \mathrm e^{-6i\varphi}\cdot\sin^{6}\theta\cdot\cos\theta\\
Y_{7}^{-5}(\theta,\varphi)&= {3\over 64}\sqrt{ 385\over 2\pi}\cdot \mathrm e^{-5i\varphi}\cdot\sin^{5}\theta\cdot(13\cos^{2}\theta-1)\\
Y_{7}^{-4}(\theta,\varphi)&= {3\over 32}\sqrt{ 385\over 2\pi}\cdot \mathrm e^{-4i\varphi}\cdot\sin^{4}\theta\cdot(13\cos^{3}\theta-3\cos\theta)\\
Y_{7}^{-3}(\theta,\varphi)&= {3\over 64}\sqrt{  35\over 2\pi}\cdot \mathrm e^{-3i\varphi}\cdot\sin^{3}\theta\cdot(143\cos^{4}\theta-66\cos^{2}\theta+3)\\
Y_{7}^{-2}(\theta,\varphi)&= {3\over 64}\sqrt{  35\over  \pi}\cdot \mathrm e^{-2i\varphi}\cdot\sin^{2}\theta\cdot(143\cos^{5}\theta-110\cos^{3}\theta+15\cos\theta)\\
Y_{7}^{-1}(\theta,\varphi)&= {1\over 64}\sqrt{ 105\over 2\pi}\cdot \mathrm e^{- i\varphi}\cdot\sin    \theta\cdot(429\cos^{6}\theta-495\cos^{4}\theta+135\cos^{2}\theta-5)\\
Y_{7}^{ 0}(\theta,\varphi)&= {1\over 32}\sqrt{  15\over  \pi}\cdot                                       (429\cos^{7}\theta-693\cos^{5}\theta+315\cos^{3}\theta-35\cos\theta)\\
Y_{7}^{ 1}(\theta,\varphi)&=-{1\over 64}\sqrt{ 105\over 2\pi}\cdot \mathrm e^{  i\varphi}\cdot\sin    \theta\cdot(429\cos^{6}\theta-495\cos^{4}\theta+135\cos^{2}\theta-5)\\
Y_{7}^{ 2}(\theta,\varphi)&= {3\over 64}\sqrt{  35\over  \pi}\cdot \mathrm e^{ 2i\varphi}\cdot\sin^{2}\theta\cdot(143\cos^{5}\theta-110\cos^{3}\theta+15\cos\theta)\\
Y_{7}^{ 3}(\theta,\varphi)&=-{3\over 64}\sqrt{  35\over 2\pi}\cdot \mathrm e^{ 3i\varphi}\cdot\sin^{3}\theta\cdot(143\cos^{4}\theta-66\cos^{2}\theta+3)\\
Y_{7}^{ 4}(\theta,\varphi)&= {3\over 32}\sqrt{ 385\over 2\pi}\cdot \mathrm e^{ 4i\varphi}\cdot\sin^{4}\theta\cdot(13\cos^{3}\theta-3\cos\theta)\\
Y_{7}^{ 5}(\theta,\varphi)&=-{3\over 64}\sqrt{ 385\over 2\pi}\cdot \mathrm e^{ 5i\varphi}\cdot\sin^{5}\theta\cdot(13\cos^{2}\theta-1)\\
Y_{7}^{ 6}(\theta,\varphi)&= {3\over 64}\sqrt{5005\over  \pi}\cdot \mathrm e^{ 6i\varphi}\cdot\sin^{6}\theta\cdot\cos\theta\\
Y_{7}^{ 7}(\theta,\varphi)&=-{3\over 64}\sqrt{ 715\over 2\pi}\cdot \mathrm e^{ 7i\varphi}\cdot\sin^{7}\theta
\end{align}$$

=== ℓ = 8 ===
$$\begin{align}
Y_{8}^{-8}(\theta,\varphi)&={ 3\over 256}\sqrt{12155\over 2\pi}\cdot \mathrm e^{-8i\varphi}\cdot\sin^{8}\theta\\
Y_{8}^{-7}(\theta,\varphi)&={ 3\over  64}\sqrt{12155\over 2\pi}\cdot \mathrm e^{-7i\varphi}\cdot\sin^{7}\theta\cdot\cos\theta\\
Y_{8}^{-6}(\theta,\varphi)&={ 1\over 128}\sqrt{7293\over \pi}\cdot \mathrm e^{-6i\varphi}\cdot\sin^{6}\theta\cdot(15\cos^{2}\theta-1)\\
Y_{8}^{-5}(\theta,\varphi)&={ 3\over  64}\sqrt{17017\over 2\pi}\cdot \mathrm e^{-5i\varphi}\cdot\sin^{5}\theta\cdot(5\cos^{3}\theta-\cos\theta)\\
Y_{8}^{-4}(\theta,\varphi)&={ 3\over 128}\sqrt{1309\over 2\pi}\cdot \mathrm e^{-4i\varphi}\cdot\sin^{4}\theta\cdot(65\cos^{4}\theta-26\cos^{2}\theta+1)\\
Y_{8}^{-3}(\theta,\varphi)&={ 1\over  64}\sqrt{19635\over 2\pi}\cdot \mathrm e^{-3i\varphi}\cdot\sin^{3}\theta\cdot(39\cos^{5}\theta-26\cos^{3}\theta+3\cos\theta)\\
Y_{8}^{-2}(\theta,\varphi)&={ 3\over 128}\sqrt{595\over \pi}\cdot \mathrm e^{-2i\varphi}\cdot\sin^{2}\theta\cdot(143\cos^{6}\theta-143\cos^{4}\theta+33\cos^{2}\theta-1)\\
Y_{8}^{-1}(\theta,\varphi)&={ 3\over  64}\sqrt{17\over 2\pi}\cdot \mathrm e^{-i\varphi}\cdot\sin\theta\cdot(715\cos^{7}\theta-1001\cos^{5}\theta+385\cos^{3}\theta-35\cos\theta)\\
Y_{8}^{ 0}(\theta,\varphi)&={ 1\over 256}\sqrt{17\over \pi}\cdot(6435\cos^{8}\theta-12012\cos^{6}\theta+6930\cos^{4}\theta-1260\cos^{2}\theta+35)\\
Y_{8}^{ 1}(\theta,\varphi)&={-3\over  64}\sqrt{17\over 2\pi}\cdot \mathrm e^{i\varphi}\cdot\sin\theta\cdot(715\cos^{7}\theta-1001\cos^{5}\theta+385\cos^{3}\theta-35\cos\theta)\\
Y_{8}^{ 2}(\theta,\varphi)&={ 3\over 128}\sqrt{595\over \pi}\cdot \mathrm e^{2i\varphi}\cdot\sin^{2}\theta\cdot(143\cos^{6}\theta-143\cos^{4}\theta+33\cos^{2}\theta-1)\\
Y_{8}^{ 3}(\theta,\varphi)&={-1\over  64}\sqrt{19635\over 2\pi}\cdot \mathrm e^{3i\varphi}\cdot\sin^{3}\theta\cdot(39\cos^{5}\theta-26\cos^{3}\theta+3\cos\theta)\\
Y_{8}^{ 4}(\theta,\varphi)&={ 3\over 128}\sqrt{1309\over 2\pi}\cdot \mathrm e^{4i\varphi}\cdot\sin^{4}\theta\cdot(65\cos^{4}\theta-26\cos^{2}\theta+1)\\
Y_{8}^{ 5}(\theta,\varphi)&={-3\over  64}\sqrt{17017\over 2\pi}\cdot \mathrm e^{5i\varphi}\cdot\sin^{5}\theta\cdot(5\cos^{3}\theta-\cos\theta)\\
Y_{8}^{ 6}(\theta,\varphi)&={ 1\over 128}\sqrt{7293\over \pi}\cdot \mathrm e^{6i\varphi}\cdot\sin^{6}\theta\cdot(15\cos^{2}\theta-1)\\
Y_{8}^{ 7}(\theta,\varphi)&={-3\over  64}\sqrt{12155\over 2\pi}\cdot \mathrm e^{7i\varphi}\cdot\sin^{7}\theta\cdot\cos\theta\\
Y_{8}^{ 8}(\theta,\varphi)&={ 3\over 256}\sqrt{12155\over 2\pi}\cdot \mathrm e^{8i\varphi}\cdot\sin^{8}\theta
\end{align}$$

=== ℓ = 9 ===
$$\begin{align}
Y_{9}^{-9}(\theta,\varphi)&={ 1\over 512}\sqrt{230945\over  \pi}\cdot \mathrm e^{-9i\varphi}\cdot\sin^{9}\theta\\
Y_{9}^{-8}(\theta,\varphi)&={ 3\over 256}\sqrt{230945\over 2\pi}\cdot \mathrm e^{-8i\varphi}\cdot\sin^{8}\theta\cdot\cos\theta\\
Y_{9}^{-7}(\theta,\varphi)&={ 3\over 512}\sqrt{ 13585\over  \pi}\cdot \mathrm e^{-7i\varphi}\cdot\sin^{7}\theta\cdot(17\cos^{2}\theta-1)\\
Y_{9}^{-6}(\theta,\varphi)&={ 1\over 128}\sqrt{ 40755\over  \pi}\cdot \mathrm e^{-6i\varphi}\cdot\sin^{6}\theta\cdot(17\cos^{3}\theta-3\cos\theta)\\
Y_{9}^{-5}(\theta,\varphi)&={ 3\over 256}\sqrt{  2717\over  \pi}\cdot \mathrm e^{-5i\varphi}\cdot\sin^{5}\theta\cdot(85\cos^{4}\theta-30\cos^{2}\theta+1)\\
Y_{9}^{-4}(\theta,\varphi)&={ 3\over 128}\sqrt{ 95095\over 2\pi}\cdot e^{-4i\varphi}\cdot\sin^{4}\theta\cdot(17\cos^{5}\theta-10\cos^{3}\theta+\cos\theta)\\
Y_{9}^{-3}(\theta,\varphi)&={ 1\over 256}\sqrt{ 21945\over  \pi}\cdot \mathrm e^{-3i\varphi}\cdot\sin^{3}\theta\cdot(221\cos^{6}\theta-195\cos^{4}\theta+39\cos^{2}\theta-1)\\
Y_{9}^{-2}(\theta,\varphi)&={ 3\over 128}\sqrt{  1045\over  \pi}\cdot \mathrm e^{-2i\varphi}\cdot\sin^{2}\theta\cdot(221\cos^{7}\theta-273\cos^{5}\theta+91\cos^{3}\theta-7\cos\theta)\\
Y_{9}^{-1}(\theta,\varphi)&={ 3\over 256}\sqrt{    95\over 2\pi}\cdot \mathrm e^{- i\varphi}\cdot\sin    \theta\cdot(2431\cos^{8}\theta-4004\cos^{6}\theta+2002\cos^{4}\theta-308\cos^{2}\theta+7)\\
Y_{9}^{ 0}(\theta,\varphi)&={ 1\over 256}\sqrt{    19\over  \pi}\cdot                                       (12155\cos^{9}\theta-25740\cos^{7}\theta+18018\cos^{5}\theta-4620\cos^{3}\theta+315\cos\theta)\\
Y_{9}^{ 1}(\theta,\varphi)&={-3\over 256}\sqrt{    95\over 2\pi}\cdot \mathrm e^{  i\varphi}\cdot\sin    \theta\cdot(2431\cos^{8}\theta-4004\cos^{6}\theta+2002\cos^{4}\theta-308\cos^{2}\theta+7)\\
Y_{9}^{ 2}(\theta,\varphi)&={ 3\over 128}\sqrt{  1045\over  \pi}\cdot \mathrm e^{ 2i\varphi}\cdot\sin^{2}\theta\cdot(221\cos^{7}\theta-273\cos^{5}\theta+91\cos^{3}\theta-7\cos\theta)\\
Y_{9}^{ 3}(\theta,\varphi)&={-1\over 256}\sqrt{ 21945\over  \pi}\cdot \mathrm e^{ 3i\varphi}\cdot\sin^{3}\theta\cdot(221\cos^{6}\theta-195\cos^{4}\theta+39\cos^{2}\theta-1)\\
Y_{9}^{ 4}(\theta,\varphi)&={ 3\over 128}\sqrt{ 95095\over 2\pi}\cdot \mathrm e^{ 4i\varphi}\cdot\sin^{4}\theta\cdot(17\cos^{5}\theta-10\cos^{3}\theta+\cos\theta)\\
Y_{9}^{ 5}(\theta,\varphi)&={-3\over 256}\sqrt{  2717\over  \pi}\cdot \mathrm e^{ 5i\varphi}\cdot\sin^{5}\theta\cdot(85\cos^{4}\theta-30\cos^{2}\theta+1)\\
Y_{9}^{ 6}(\theta,\varphi)&={ 1\over 128}\sqrt{ 40755\over  \pi}\cdot \mathrm e^{ 6i\varphi}\cdot\sin^{6}\theta\cdot(17\cos^{3}\theta-3\cos\theta)\\
Y_{9}^{ 7}(\theta,\varphi)&={-3\over 512}\sqrt{ 13585\over  \pi}\cdot \mathrm e^{ 7i\varphi}\cdot\sin^{7}\theta\cdot(17\cos^{2}\theta-1)\\
Y_{9}^{ 8}(\theta,\varphi)&={ 3\over 256}\sqrt{230945\over 2\pi}\cdot \mathrm e^{ 8i\varphi}\cdot\sin^{8}\theta\cdot\cos\theta\\
Y_{9}^{ 9}(\theta,\varphi)&={-1\over 512}\sqrt{230945\over  \pi}\cdot \mathrm e^{ 9i\varphi}\cdot\sin^{9}\theta
\end{align}$$

=== ℓ = 10 ===
$$\begin{align}
Y_{10}^{-10}(\theta,\varphi)&={1\over 1024}\sqrt{969969\over \pi}\cdot \mathrm e^{-10i\varphi}\cdot\sin^{10}\theta\\
Y_{10}^{- 9}(\theta,\varphi)&={1\over 512}\sqrt{4849845\over \pi}\cdot \mathrm e^{-9i\varphi}\cdot\sin^{9}\theta\cdot\cos\theta\\
Y_{10}^{- 8}(\theta,\varphi)&={1\over 512}\sqrt{255255\over 2\pi}\cdot \mathrm e^{-8i\varphi}\cdot\sin^{8}\theta\cdot(19\cos^{2}\theta-1)\\
Y_{10}^{- 7}(\theta,\varphi)&={3\over 512}\sqrt{85085\over \pi}\cdot \mathrm e^{-7i\varphi}\cdot\sin^{7}\theta\cdot(19\cos^{3}\theta-3\cos\theta)\\
Y_{10}^{- 6}(\theta,\varphi)&={3\over 1024}\sqrt{5005\over \pi}\cdot \mathrm e^{-6i\varphi}\cdot\sin^{6}\theta\cdot(323\cos^{4}\theta-102\cos^{2}\theta+3)\\
Y_{10}^{- 5}(\theta,\varphi)&={3\over 256}\sqrt{1001\over \pi}\cdot \mathrm e^{-5i\varphi}\cdot\sin^{5}\theta\cdot(323\cos^{5}\theta-170\cos^{3}\theta+15\cos\theta)\\
Y_{10}^{- 4}(\theta,\varphi)&={3\over 256}\sqrt{5005\over 2\pi}\cdot \mathrm e^{-4i\varphi}\cdot\sin^{4}\theta\cdot(323\cos^{6}\theta-255\cos^{4}\theta+45\cos^{2}\theta-1)\\
Y_{10}^{- 3}(\theta,\varphi)&={3\over 256}\sqrt{5005\over \pi}\cdot \mathrm e^{-3i\varphi}\cdot\sin^{3}\theta\cdot(323\cos^{7}\theta-357\cos^{5}\theta+105\cos^{3}\theta-7\cos\theta)\\
Y_{10}^{- 2}(\theta,\varphi)&={3\over 512}\sqrt{385\over 2\pi}\cdot \mathrm e^{-2i\varphi}\cdot\sin^{2}\theta\cdot(4199\cos^{8}\theta-6188\cos^{6}\theta+2730\cos^{4}\theta-364\cos^{2}\theta+7)\\
Y_{10}^{- 1}(\theta,\varphi)&={1\over 256}\sqrt{1155\over 2\pi}\cdot \mathrm e^{-i\varphi}\cdot\sin\theta\cdot(4199\cos^{9}\theta-7956\cos^{7}\theta+4914\cos^{5}\theta-1092\cos^{3}\theta+63\cos\theta)\\
Y_{10}^{  0}(\theta,\varphi)&={1\over 512}\sqrt{21\over \pi}\cdot(46189\cos^{10}\theta-109395\cos^{8}\theta+90090\cos^{6}\theta-30030\cos^{4}\theta+3465\cos^{2}\theta-63)\\
Y_{10}^{  1}(\theta,\varphi)&={-1\over 256}\sqrt{1155\over 2\pi}\cdot \mathrm e^{i\varphi}\cdot\sin\theta\cdot(4199\cos^{9}\theta-7956\cos^{7}\theta+4914\cos^{5}\theta-1092\cos^{3}\theta+63\cos\theta)\\
Y_{10}^{  2}(\theta,\varphi)&={3\over 512}\sqrt{385\over 2\pi}\cdot \mathrm e^{2i\varphi}\cdot\sin^{2}\theta\cdot(4199\cos^{8}\theta-6188\cos^{6}\theta+2730\cos^{4}\theta-364\cos^{2}\theta+7)\\
Y_{10}^{  3}(\theta,\varphi)&={-3\over 256}\sqrt{5005\over \pi}\cdot \mathrm e^{3i\varphi}\cdot\sin^{3}\theta\cdot(323\cos^{7}\theta-357\cos^{5}\theta+105\cos^{3}\theta-7\cos\theta)\\
Y_{10}^{  4}(\theta,\varphi)&={3\over 256}\sqrt{5005\over 2\pi}\cdot \mathrm e^{4i\varphi}\cdot\sin^{4}\theta\cdot(323\cos^{6}\theta-255\cos^{4}\theta+45\cos^{2}\theta-1)\\
Y_{10}^{  5}(\theta,\varphi)&={-3\over 256}\sqrt{1001\over \pi}\cdot \mathrm e^{5i\varphi}\cdot\sin^{5}\theta\cdot(323\cos^{5}\theta-170\cos^{3}\theta+15\cos\theta)\\
Y_{10}^{  6}(\theta,\varphi)&={3\over 1024}\sqrt{5005\over \pi}\cdot \mathrm e^{6i\varphi}\cdot\sin^{6}\theta\cdot(323\cos^{4}\theta-102\cos^{2}\theta+3)\\
Y_{10}^{  7}(\theta,\varphi)&={-3\over 512}\sqrt{85085\over \pi}\cdot \mathrm e^{7i\varphi}\cdot\sin^{7}\theta\cdot(19\cos^{3}\theta-3\cos\theta)\\
Y_{10}^{  8}(\theta,\varphi)&={1\over 512}\sqrt{255255\over 2\pi}\cdot \mathrm e^{8i\varphi}\cdot\sin^{8}\theta\cdot(19\cos^{2}\theta-1)\\
Y_{10}^{  9}(\theta,\varphi)&={-1\over 512}\sqrt{4849845\over \pi}\cdot \mathrm e^{9i\varphi}\cdot\sin^{9}\theta\cdot\cos\theta\\
Y_{10}^{ 10}(\theta,\varphi)&={1\over 1024}\sqrt{969969\over \pi}\cdot \mathrm e^{10i\varphi}\cdot\sin^{10}\theta
\end{align}$$

== Visualization of complex spherical harmonics ==
=== 2D polar/azimuthal angle maps ===
Below the complex spherical harmonics are represented on 2D plots with the azimuthal angle, $\phi$, on the horizontal axis and the polar angle, $\theta$, on the vertical axis. The saturation of the color at any point represents the magnitude of the spherical harmonic and the hue represents the phase.

The nodal 'line of latitude' are visible as horizontal white lines. The nodal 'line of longitude' are visible as vertical white lines.

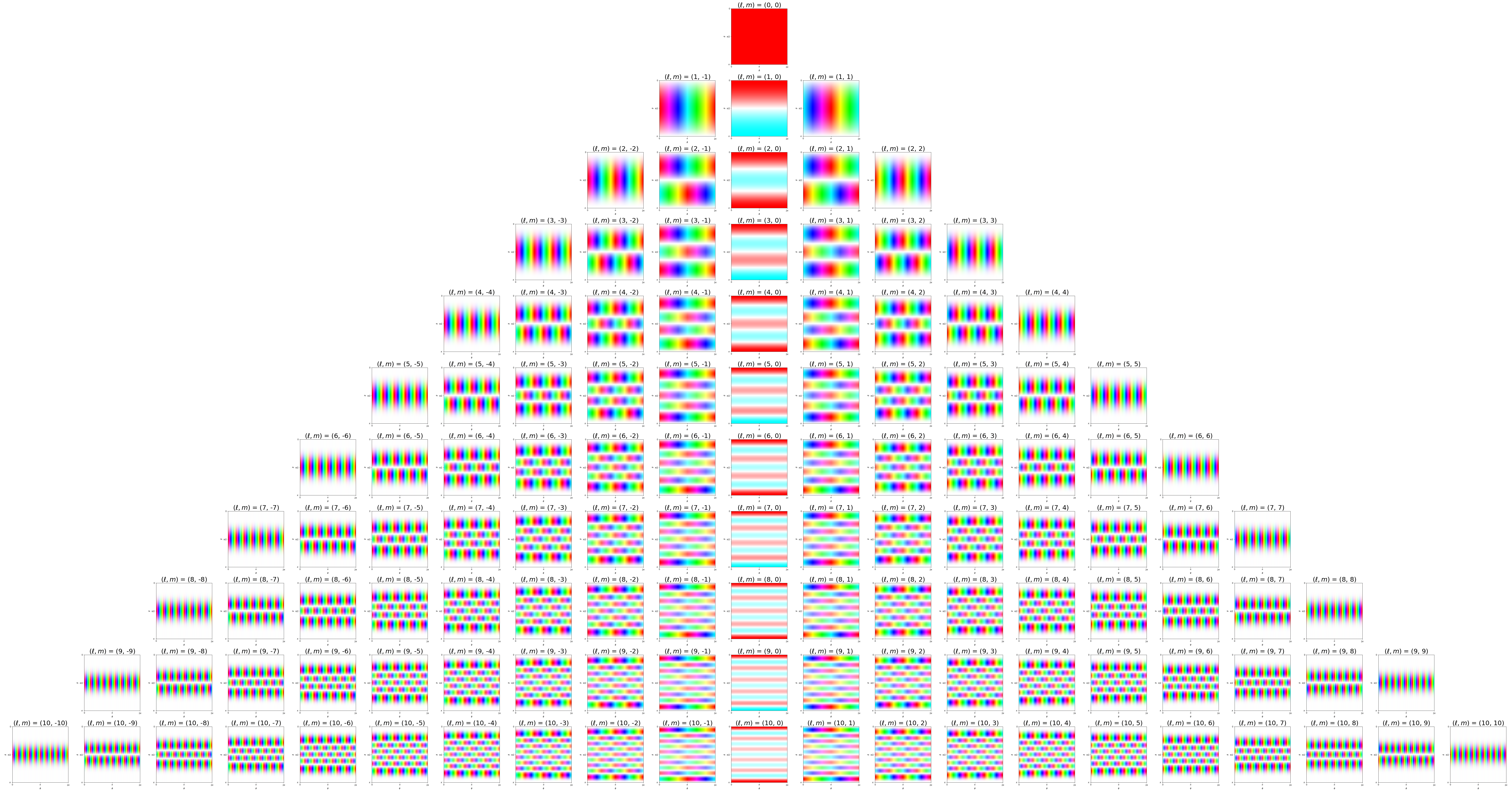
Visual Array of Complex Spherical Harmonics Represented as 2D Theta/Phi Maps

=== Polar plots ===
Below the complex spherical harmonics are represented on polar plots. The magnitude of the spherical harmonic at particular polar and azimuthal angles is represented by the saturation of the color at that point and the phase is represented by the hue at that point.

Visual Array of Complex Spherical Harmonics Represented with Polar Plot

=== Polar plots with magnitude as radius ===
Below the complex spherical harmonics are represented on polar plots. The magnitude of the spherical harmonic at particular polar and azimuthal angles is represented by the radius of the plot at that point and the phase is represented by the hue at that point.

Visual Array of Complex Spherical Harmonics Represented with Polar Plot with Magnitude Mapped to Radius

== Real spherical harmonics ==
For each real spherical harmonic, the corresponding atomic orbital symbol (s, p, d, f) is reported as well.

For ℓ = 0, …, 3, see.

=== ℓ = 0 ===
$$Y_{0,0} = s = Y_0^0 = \frac{1}{2} \sqrt{\frac{1}{\pi}}$$

=== ℓ = 1 ===
$$\begin{align}
Y_{1,-1} & = p_y =  i \sqrt{\frac{1}{2}} \left( Y_1^{- 1} + Y_1^1 \right) = \sqrt{\frac{3}{4 \pi}} \cdot \frac{y}{r} = \sqrt{\frac{3}{4 \pi}} \sin( \theta) \sin (\varphi)  \\
Y_{1,0} & = p_z = Y_1^0 = \sqrt{\frac{3}{4 \pi}} \cdot \frac{z}{r} = \sqrt{\frac{3}{4 \pi}} \cos( \theta) \\
Y_{1,1} & = p_x = \sqrt{\frac{1}{2}} \left( Y_1^{- 1} - Y_1^1 \right) = \sqrt{\frac{3}{4 \pi}} \cdot \frac{x}{r} = \sqrt{\frac{3}{4 \pi}} \sin( \theta) \cos (\varphi)
\end{align}$$

=== ℓ = 2 ===
$$\begin{align}
Y_{2,-2} & = d_{xy} = i \sqrt{\frac{1}{2}} \left( Y_2^{- 2} - Y_2^2\right) = \frac{1}{2} \sqrt{\frac{15}{\pi}} \cdot \frac{x y}{r^2} = \frac{1}{4} \sqrt{\frac{15}{\pi}} \sin^{2}(\theta) \sin(2\varphi) \\
Y_{2,-1} & = d_{yz} = i \sqrt{\frac{1}{2}} \left( Y_2^{- 1} + Y_2^1 \right) = \frac{1}{2} \sqrt{\frac{15}{\pi}} \cdot \frac{y \cdot z}{r^2} = \frac{1}{4} \sqrt{\frac{15}{\pi}} \sin(2 \theta) \sin (\varphi) \\
Y_{2,0} & = d_{z^2} = Y_2^0 = \frac{1}{4} \sqrt{\frac{5}{\pi}} \cdot \frac{3z^2 - r^2}{r^2}  = \frac{1}{4} \sqrt{\frac{5}{\pi}} (3\cos^{2}(\theta) -1)\\
Y_{2,1} & = d_{xz} = \sqrt{\frac{1}{2}} \left( Y_2^{- 1} - Y_2^1 \right) = \frac{1}{2} \sqrt{\frac{15}{\pi}} \cdot \frac{x \cdot z}{r^2} = \frac{1}{4} \sqrt{\frac{15}{\pi}} \sin(2 \theta) \cos (\varphi)\\
Y_{2,2} & = d_{x^2-y^2} = \sqrt{\frac{1}{2}} \left( Y_2^{- 2} + Y_2^2 \right) = \frac{1}{4} \sqrt{\frac{15}{\pi}} \cdot \frac{x^2 - y^2 }{r^2} = \frac{1}{4} \sqrt{\frac{15}{\pi}} \sin^{2}(\theta) \cos(2\varphi)
\end{align}$$

=== ℓ = 3 ===
$$\begin{align}
Y_{3,-3} & = f_{y(3x^2-y^2)} = i \sqrt{\frac{1}{2}} \left( Y_3^{- 3} + Y_3^3 \right) = \frac{1}{4} \sqrt{\frac{35}{2 \pi}} \cdot \frac{y \left( 3 x^2 - y^2 \right)}{r^3} \\
Y_{3,-2} & = f_{xyz} = i \sqrt{\frac{1}{2}} \left( Y_3^{- 2} - Y_3^2 \right) = \frac{1}{2} \sqrt{\frac{105}{\pi}} \cdot \frac{xy \cdot z}{r^3} \\
Y_{3,-1} & = f_{yz^2} = i \sqrt{\frac{1}{2}} \left( Y_3^{- 1} + Y_3^1 \right) = \frac{1}{4} \sqrt{\frac{21}{2 \pi}} \cdot \frac{y \cdot (5 z^2 - r^2)}{r^3} \\
Y_{3,0} & = f_{z^3} = Y_3^0 = \frac{1}{4} \sqrt{\frac{7}{\pi}} \cdot \frac{5 z^3 - 3 z r^2}{r^3} \\
Y_{3,1} & = f_{xz^2} = \sqrt{\frac{1}{2}} \left( Y_3^{- 1} - Y_3^1 \right) = \frac{1}{4} \sqrt{\frac{21}{2 \pi}} \cdot \frac{x \cdot (5 z^2 - r^2)}{r^3} \\
Y_{3,2} & = f_{z(x^2-y^2)} = \sqrt{\frac{1}{2}} \left( Y_3^{- 2} + Y_3^2 \right) = \frac{1}{4} \sqrt{\frac{105}{\pi}} \cdot \frac{\left( x^2 - y^2 \right) \cdot  z}{r^3} \\
Y_{3,3} & = f_{x(x^2-3y^2)} = \sqrt{\frac{1}{2}} \left( Y_3^{- 3} - Y_3^3 \right) = \frac{1}{4} \sqrt{\frac{35}{2 \pi}} \cdot \frac{x \left( x^2 - 3 y^2 \right)}{r^3}
\end{align}$$

=== ℓ = 4 ===
$$\begin{align}
Y_{4,-4} & = i \sqrt{\frac{1}{2}} \left( Y_4^{- 4} - Y_4^4 \right) = \frac{3}{4} \sqrt{\frac{35}{\pi}} \cdot \frac{xy \left( x^2 - y^2 \right)}{r^4} \\
Y_{4,-3} & = i \sqrt{\frac{1}{2}} \left( Y_4^{- 3} + Y_4^3 \right) = \frac{3}{4} \sqrt{\frac{35}{2 \pi}} \cdot \frac{y (3 x^2 - y^2) \cdot z}{r^4} \\
Y_{4,-2} & = i \sqrt{\frac{1}{2}} \left( Y_4^{- 2} - Y_4^2 \right) = \frac{3}{4} \sqrt{\frac{5}{\pi}} \cdot \frac{xy \cdot (7 z^2 - r^2)}{r^4} \\
Y_{4,-1} & = i \sqrt{\frac{1}{2}} \left( Y_4^{- 1} + Y_4^1\right) = \frac{3}{4} \sqrt{\frac{5}{2 \pi}} \cdot \frac{y \cdot (7 z^3 - 3 z r^2)}{r^4} \\
Y_{4,0} & = Y_4^0 = \frac{3}{16} \sqrt{\frac{1}{\pi}} \cdot \frac{35 z^4 - 30 z^2 r^2 + 3 r^4}{r^4} \\
Y_{4,1} & = \sqrt{\frac{1}{2}} \left( Y_4^{- 1} - Y_4^1 \right) = \frac{3}{4} \sqrt{\frac{5}{2 \pi}} \cdot \frac{x \cdot (7 z^3 - 3 z r^2)}{r^4} \\
Y_{4,2} & = \sqrt{\frac{1}{2}} \left( Y_4^{- 2} + Y_4^2 \right) = \frac{3}{8} \sqrt{\frac{5}{\pi}} \cdot \frac{(x^2 - y^2) \cdot (7 z^2 - r^2)}{r^4} \\
Y_{4,3} & = \sqrt{\frac{1}{2}} \left( Y_4^{- 3} - Y_4^3 \right) = \frac{3}{4} \sqrt{\frac{35}{2 \pi}} \cdot \frac{x(x^2 - 3 y^2) \cdot z}{r^4} \\
Y_{4,4} & = \sqrt{\frac{1}{2}} \left( Y_4^{- 4} + Y_4^4 \right) = \frac{3}{16} \sqrt{\frac{35}{\pi}} \cdot \frac{x^2 \left( x^2 - 3 y^2 \right) - y^2 \left( 3 x^2 - y^2 \right)}{r^4}
\end{align}$$

== Visualization of real spherical harmonics ==
=== 2D polar/azimuthal angle maps ===
Below the real spherical harmonics are represented on 2D plots with the azimuthal angle, $\phi$, on the horizontal axis and the polar angle, $\theta$, on the vertical axis. The saturation of the color at any point represents the magnitude of the spherical harmonic. Positive values are red and negative values are teal.

The nodal 'line of latitude' are visible as horizontal white lines. The nodal 'line of longitude' are visible as vertical white lines.

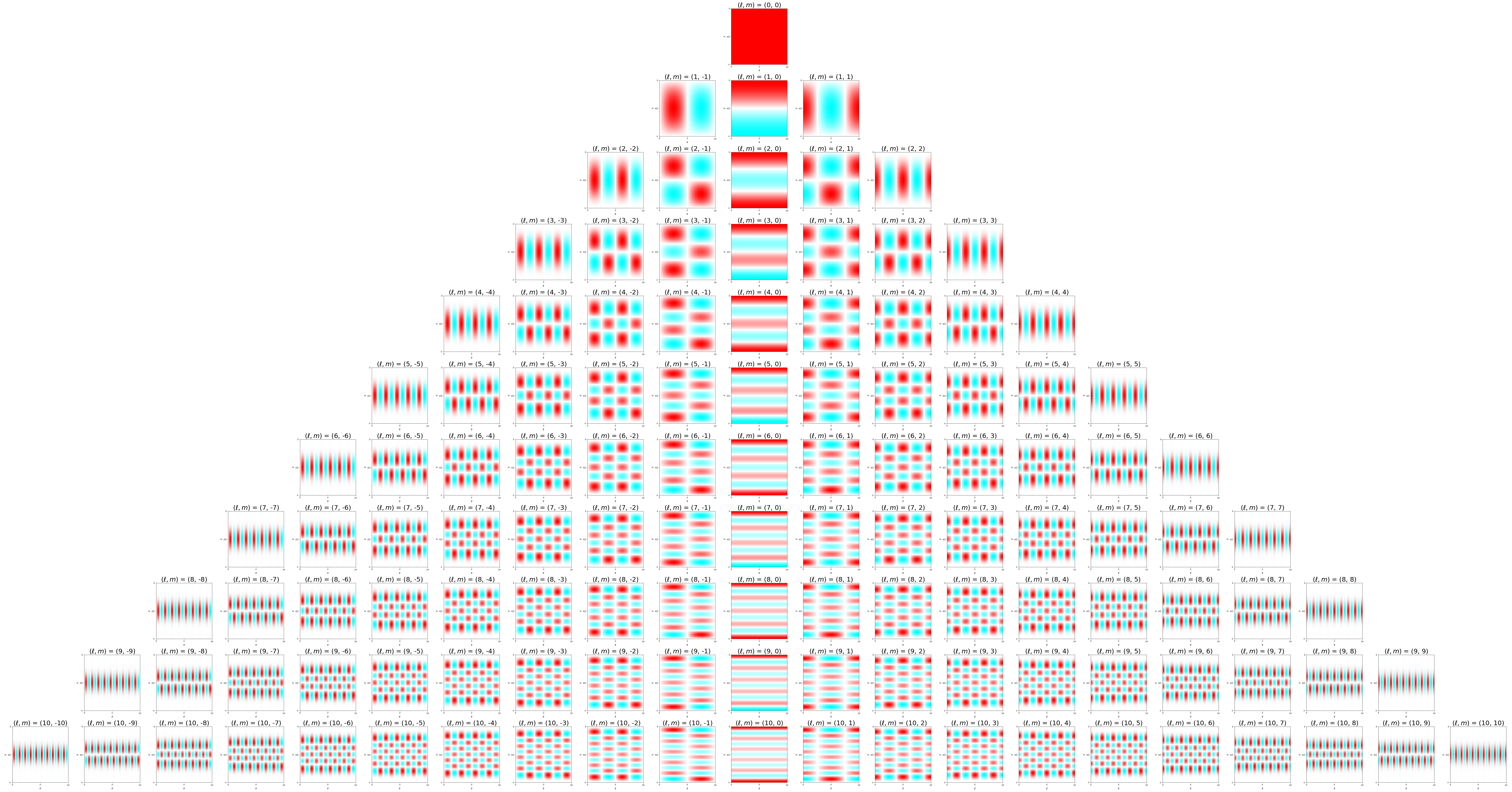
Visual Array of Real Spherical Harmonics Represented as 2D Theta/Phi Maps

=== Polar plots ===
Below the real spherical harmonics are represented on polar plots. The magnitude of the spherical harmonic at particular polar and azimuthal angles is represented by the saturation of the color at that point and the phase is represented by the hue at that point.

Visual Array of Real Spherical Harmonics Represented with Polar Plot

=== Polar plots with magnitude as radius ===
Below the real spherical harmonics are represented on polar plots. The magnitude of the spherical harmonic at particular polar and azimuthal angles is represented by the radius of the plot at that point and the phase is represented by the hue at that point.

Visual Array of Real Spherical Harmonics Represented with Polar Plot with Magnitude Mapped to Radius

=== Polar plots with amplitude as elevation ===
Below the real spherical harmonics are represented on polar plots. The amplitude of the spherical harmonic (magnitude and sign) at a particular polar and azimuthal angle is represented by the elevation of the plot at that point above or below the surface of a uniform sphere. The magnitude is also represented by the saturation of the color at a given point. The phase is represented by the hue at a given point.

Visual Array of Real Spherical Harmonics Represented with Polar Plot with Amplitude Mapped to Elevation and Saturation

== See also ==
- Spherical harmonics
