= Zonal spherical harmonics =

In the mathematical study of rotational symmetry, the zonal spherical harmonics are special spherical harmonics that are invariant under the rotation through a particular fixed axis. The zonal spherical functions are a broad extension of the notion of zonal spherical harmonics to allow for a more general symmetry group.

On the two-dimensional sphere, the unique zonal spherical harmonic of degree ℓ invariant under rotations fixing the north pole is represented in spherical coordinates by $Z^{(\ell)}(\theta,\phi) = \frac{2\ell + 1}{4 \pi} P_\ell(\cos\theta)$ where P_{ℓ} is the normalized Legendre polynomial of degree ℓ, $P_\ell(1) = 1$. The generic zonal spherical harmonic of degree ℓ is denoted by $Z^{(\ell)}_{\mathbf{x}}(\mathbf{y})$, where x is a point on the sphere representing the fixed axis, and y is the variable of the function. This can be obtained by rotation of the basic zonal harmonic $Z^{(\ell)}(\theta,\phi).$

In n-dimensional Euclidean space, zonal spherical harmonics are defined as follows. Let x be a point on the (n−1)-sphere. Define $Z^{(\ell)}_{\mathbf{x}}$ to be the dual representation of the linear functional $P\mapsto P(\mathbf{x})$ in the finite-dimensional Hilbert space $\mathcal H_\ell$ of spherical harmonics of degree $\ell$ with respect to the uniform measure on the sphere $\mathbb{S}^{n-1}$. In other words, we have a reproducing kernel:$Y(\mathbf{x}) = \int_{S^{n-1}} Z^{(\ell)}_{\mathbf{x}}(\mathbf{y})Y(\mathbf{y})\,d\Omega(y), \quad \forall Y \in \mathcal H_\ell$ where $\Omega$ is the uniform measure on $\mathbb{S}^{n-1}$.

== Relationship with harmonic potentials ==
The zonal harmonics appear naturally as coefficients of the Poisson kernel for the unit ball in R^{n}: for x and y unit vectors, $\frac{1}{\omega_{n-1}}\frac{1-r^2}{|\mathbf{x}-r\mathbf{y}|^n} = \sum_{k=0}^\infty r^k Z^{(k)}_{\mathbf{x}}(\mathbf{y}),$ where $\omega_{n-1}$ is the surface area of the (n-1)-dimensional sphere. They are also related to the Newton kernel via $\frac{1}{|\mathbf{x}-\mathbf{y}|^{n-2}} = \sum_{k=0}^\infty c_{n,k} \frac{|\mathbf{x}|^k}{|\mathbf{y}|^{n+k-2}}Z_{\mathbf{x}/|\mathbf{x}|}^{(k)}(\mathbf{y}/|\mathbf{y}|)$ where x,y ∈ R^{n} and the constants c_{n,k} are given by $c_{n,k} = \frac{1}{\omega_{n-1}}\frac{2k+n-2}{(n-2)}.$

The coefficients of the Taylor series of the Newton kernel (with suitable normalization) are precisely the ultraspherical polynomials. Thus, the zonal spherical harmonics can be expressed as follows. If α = (n−2)/2, then $Z^{(\ell)}_{\mathbf{x}}(\mathbf{y}) = \frac{n+2\ell-2}{n-2}C_\ell^{(\alpha)}(\mathbf{x}\cdot\mathbf{y})$ where $c_{n, \ell}$ are the constants above and $C_\ell^{(\alpha)}$ is the ultraspherical polynomial of degree $\ell$. The 2-dimensional case$Z^{(\ell)}(\theta,\phi) = \frac{2\ell + 1}{4 \pi} P_\ell(\cos\theta)$is a special case of that, since the Legendre polynomials are the special case of the ultraspherical polynomial when $\alpha = 1/2$.

== Properties ==
- The zonal spherical harmonics are rotationally invariant, meaning that $Z^{(\ell)}_{R\mathbf{x}}(R\mathbf{y}) = Z^{(\ell)}_{\mathbf{x}}(\mathbf{y})$ for every orthogonal transformation R. Conversely, any function f(x,y) on S^{n−1}×S^{n−1} that is a spherical harmonic in y for each fixed x, and that satisfies this invariance property, is a constant multiple of the degree ℓ zonal harmonic.
- If Y_{1}, ..., Y_{d} is an orthonormal basis of H_{ℓ}, then $Z^{(\ell)}_{\mathbf{x}}(\mathbf{y}) = \sum_{k=1}^d Y_k(\mathbf{x})\overline{Y_k(\mathbf{y})}.$
- Evaluating at x = y gives $Z^{(\ell)}_{\mathbf{x}}(\mathbf{x}) = \omega_{n-1}^{-1} \dim \mathbf{H}_\ell.$
