= Dirac–Kähler equation =

Geometric analogue of the Dirac equation

In theoretical physics, the Dirac–Kähler equation, also known as the Ivanenko–Landau–Kähler equation, is the geometric analogue of the Dirac equation that can be defined on any pseudo-Riemannian manifold using the Laplace–de Rham operator. In four-dimensional flat spacetime, it is equivalent to four copies of the Dirac equation that transform into each other under Lorentz transformations, although this is no longer true in curved spacetime. The geometric structure gives the equation a natural discretization that is equivalent to the staggered fermion formalism in lattice field theory, making Dirac–Kähler fermions the formal continuum limit of staggered fermions. The equation was discovered by Dmitri Ivanenko and Lev Landau in 1928 and later rediscovered by Erich Kähler in 1962.

== Mathematical overview ==
In four dimensional Euclidean spacetime a generic fields of differential forms

$$\Phi = \sum_{H} \Phi_H(x)dx_H,$$

is written as a linear combination of sixteen basis forms indexed by $H$, which runs over the sixteen ordered combinations of indices $\{\mu_1,\dots, \mu_h\}$ with $\mu_1<\cdots < \mu_h$. Each index runs from one to four. Here $\Phi_H(x) = \Phi_{\mu_1\dots \mu_h}(x)$ are antisymmetric tensor fields while $dx_H$ are the corresponding differential form basis elements

$$dx_H = dx^{\mu_1}\wedge \cdots \wedge dx^{\mu_h}.$$

Using the Hodge star operator $\star$, the exterior derivative $d$ is related to the codifferential through $\delta = -\star d \star$. These form the Laplace–de Rham operator $d-\delta$ which can be viewed as the square root of the Laplacian operator since $(d-\delta)^2=\square$. The Dirac–Kähler equation is motivated by noting that this is also the property of the Dirac operator, yielding

Dirac–Kähler equation

$(d-\delta +m)\Phi = 0.$

This equation is closely related to the usual Dirac equation, a connection which emerges from the close relation between the exterior algebra of differential forms and the Clifford algebra of which Dirac spinors are irreducible representations. For the basis elements to satisfy the Clifford algebra $\{dx^\mu,dx^\nu\} = 2\delta^{\mu\nu}$, it is required to introduce a new Clifford product $\vee$ acting on basis elements as

$$dx_\mu \vee dx_\nu = dx_\mu \wedge dx_\nu + \delta_{\mu\nu}.$$

Using this product, the action of the Laplace–de Rham operator on differential form basis elements is written as

$$(d-\delta)\Phi(x) = dx^\mu \vee \partial_\mu \Phi(x).$$

To acquire the Dirac equation, a change of basis must be performed, where the new basis can be packaged into a matrix $Z_{ab}$ defined using the Dirac matrices

$$Z_{ab} = \sum_H (-1)^{h(h-1)/2}(\gamma_H)^T_{ab} dx_H.$$

The matrix $Z$ is designed to satisfy $dx_\mu \vee Z = \gamma_\mu^T Z$, decomposing the Clifford algebra into four irreducible copies of the Dirac algebra. This is because in this basis the Clifford product only mixes the column elements indexed by $a$. Writing the differential form in this basis

$$\Phi = \sum_{ab}\Psi(x)_{ab}Z_{ab},$$

transforms the Dirac–Kähler equation into four sets of the Dirac equation indexed by $b$

$$(\gamma^\mu \partial_\mu +m)\Psi(x)_b = 0.$$

The minimally coupled Dirac–Kähler equation is found by replacing the derivative with the covariant derivative $dx^\mu \vee \partial_\mu \rightarrow dx^\mu \vee D_\mu$ leading to

$$(d-\delta+m)\Phi = iA\vee \Phi.$$

As before, this is also equivalent to four copies of the Dirac equation. In the abelian case $A = eA_\mu dx^\mu$, while in the non-abelian case there are additional color indices. The Dirac–Kähler fermion $\Phi$ also picks up color indices, with it formally corresponding to cross-sections of the Whitney product of the Atiyah–Kähler bundle of differential forms with the vector bundle of local color spaces.

=== Discretization ===
There is a natural way in which to discretize the Dirac–Kähler equation using the correspondence between exterior algebra and simplicial complexes. In four dimensional space a lattice can be considered as a simplicial complex, whose simplexes are constructed using a basis of $h$-dimensional hypercubes $C^{(h)}_{x,H}$ with a base point $x$ and an orientation determined by $H$. Then a h-chain is a formal linear combination

$$C^{(h)} = \sum_{x,H}\alpha_{x,H}C^{(h)}_{x,H}.$$

The h-chains admit a boundary operator $\Delta C_{x,H}^{(h)}$ defined as the (h-1)-simplex forming the boundary of the h-chain. A coboundary operator $\nabla C_{x,H}^{(h)}$ can be similarly defined to yield a (h+1)-chain. The dual space of chains consists of $h$-cochains $\Phi^{(h)}(C^{(h)})$, which are linear functions acting on the h-chains mapping them to real numbers. The boundary and coboundary operators admit similar structures in dual space called the dual boundary $\hat \Delta$ and dual coboundary $\hat \nabla$ defined to satisfy

$$(\hat \Delta \Phi)(C) = \Phi(\Delta C),  \ \ \ \ \ \ \ (\hat \nabla \Phi)(C) = \Phi(\nabla C).$$

Under the correspondence between the exterior algebra and simplicial complexes, differential forms are equivalent to cochains, while the exterior derivative and codifferential correspond to the dual boundary and dual coboundary, respectively. Therefore, the Dirac–Kähler equation is written on simplicial complexes as

$$(\hat \Delta - \hat \nabla +m)\Phi(C) = 0.$$

The resulting discretized Dirac–Kähler fermion $\Phi(C)$ is equivalent to the staggered fermion found in lattice field theory, which can be seen explicitly by an explicit change of basis. This equivalence shows that the continuum Dirac–Kähler fermion is the formal continuum limit of fermion staggered fermions.

== Relation to the Dirac equation ==
As described previously, the Dirac–Kähler equation in flat spacetime is equivalent to four copies of the Dirac equation, despite being a set of equations for antisymmetric tensor fields. The ability of integer spin tensor fields to describe half integer spinor fields is explained by the fact that Lorentz transformations do not commute with the internal Dirac–Kähler $\text{SO}(2,4)$ symmetry, with the parameters of this symmetry being tensors rather than scalars. This means that the Lorentz transformations mix different spins together and the Dirac fermions are not strictly speaking half-integer spin representations of the Clifford algebra. They instead correspond to a coherent superposition of differential forms. In higher dimensions, particularly on $2^{2^n}$ dimensional surfaces, the Dirac–Kähler equation is equivalent to $2^{2^{n-1}}$ Dirac equations.

In curved spacetime, the Dirac–Kähler equation no longer decomposes into four Dirac equations. Rather it is a modified Dirac equation acquired if the Dirac operator remained the square root of the Laplace operator, a property not shared by the Dirac equation in curved spacetime. This comes at the expense of Lorentz invariance, although these effects are suppressed by powers of the Planck mass. The equation also differs in that its zero modes on a compact manifold are always guaranteed to exist whenever some of the Betti numbers vanish, being given by the harmonic forms, unlike for the Dirac equation which never has zero modes on a manifold with positive curvature.

== See also ==
- Fermion doubling
- Lattice QCD
