= Staggered fermion =

Fermion discretization with four doublers

In lattice field theory, staggered fermions (also known as Kogut–Susskind fermions) are a fermion discretization that reduces the number of fermion doublers from sixteen to four. They are one of the fastest lattice fermions when it comes to simulations and they also possess some nice features such as a remnant chiral symmetry, making them very popular in lattice QCD calculations. Staggered fermions were first formulated by John Kogut and Leonard Susskind in 1975 and were later found to be equivalent to the discretized version of the Dirac–Kähler fermion.

== Constructing staggered fermions ==
=== Single-component basis ===
The naively discretized Dirac action in Euclidean spacetime with lattice spacing $a$ and Dirac fields $\psi_n$ at every lattice point, indexed by $n = (n_1,n_2,n_3,n_4)$, takes the form

$$S = a^4 \sum_{n \in \Lambda}\bar \psi_n \bigg(\sum^4_{\mu=1}\gamma_\mu \frac{\psi_{n+\hat\mu}-\psi_{n-\hat \mu}}{2a}+m\psi_n\bigg).$$

Staggered fermions are constructed from this by performing the staggered transformation into a new basis of fields $\psi_n'$ defined by

$$\psi_n = \gamma_1^{n_1}\gamma_2^{n_2}\gamma_3^{n_3}\gamma_4^{n_4}\psi'_n.$$

Since Dirac matrices square to the identity, this position dependent transformation mixes the fermion spin components in a way that repeats itself every two lattice spacings. Its effect is to diagonalize the action in the spinor indices, meaning that the action ends up splitting into four distinct parts, one for each Dirac spinor component. Denoting one of those components by $\chi_n$, which is Grassmann variable with no spin structure, the other three components can be dropped, yielding the single-component staggered action

$$S = a^4 \sum_n \bar \chi_n \bigg(\sum^4_{\mu=1}\eta_\mu(n)\frac{\chi_{n+\hat \mu}-\chi_{n-\hat \mu}}{2a}+m\chi_n\bigg),$$

where $\hat \mu$ are unit vectors in the $\mu$ direction and the staggered sign function is given by $\eta_i(n) = (-1)^{\sum_{j<i}n_j}$. The staggered transformation is part of a larger class of transformations $\psi_n \rightarrow A_n \psi_n$ satisfying $A_n^\dagger \gamma_\mu A_{n+\hat \mu} = \Delta_\mu(n) \in U(1)^{\otimes 4}$. Together with a necessary consistency condition on the plaquettes, all these transformations are equivalent to the staggered transformation. Due to fermion doubling, the original naive action described sixteen fermions, but having discarded three of the four copies this new action describes only four.

=== Spin-taste basis ===
To explicitly show that the single-component staggered fermion action describes four Dirac fermions requires blocking the lattice into hypercubes and reinterpreting the Grassmann fields at the sixteen hypercube sites as the sixteen degrees of freedom of the four fermions. In analogy to the usage of flavour in particle physics, these four fermions are referred to be different tastes of fermions. The blocked lattice sites are indexed by $h_\mu$ while for each of these the internal hypercube sites are indexed by $s_\mu$, whose vector components are either zero or one. In this notation the original lattice vector is written as $n_\mu = 2h_\mu+s_\mu$. The matrices $\Gamma^{(s)} = \gamma_1^{s_1}\gamma_2^{s_2}\gamma_3^{s_3}\gamma_4^{s_4}$ are used to define the spin-taste basis of staggered fermions

$$\psi^{t}(h)_\alpha = \frac{1}{8}\sum_s \Gamma^{(s)}_{\alpha t}\chi(2h+s), \ \ \ \ \ \ \ \ \ \bar \psi^{t}(h)_\alpha = \frac{1}{8}\sum_s \bar \chi(2h+s)(\Gamma^{(s)\dagger})_{t\alpha}.$$

The taste index $t$ runs over the four tastes while the spin index $\alpha$ runs over the four spin components. This change of basis turns the one-component action on the lattice with spacing $a$ into the spin-taste action with an effective lattice spacing of $b=2a$ given by

$$S = b^4 \sum_h \bar \psi_n \bigg\{\sum_\mu[(\gamma_\mu \otimes 1)\partial_\mu + \tfrac{b}{2}(\gamma_5 \otimes \gamma_5 \gamma_\mu^T)\square_\mu]+m(1 \otimes 1)\bigg\}\psi_h.$$

Here $\partial_\mu$ and $\square_\mu$ are shorthand for the symmetrically discretized derivative and Laplacian, respectively. Meanwhile, the tensor notation separates out the spin and taste matrices as $[(A\otimes B) \psi_n]^t(h)_\alpha = A_\alpha{}^\beta B^t{}_{t'}\psi^{t'}(h)_\beta$. Since the kinetic and mass terms are diagonal in the taste indices, the action describes four degenerate Dirac fermions. These interact together in what are known as taste mixing interactions through the second term, which is an irrelevant dimension five operator that vanishes in the continuum limit. This action is very similar to the action constructed using four Wilson fermions with the only difference being in the second term tensor structure, which for Wilson fermions is spin and taste diagonal $( 1 \otimes 1)$.

A key property of staggered fermions, not shared by some other lattice fermions such as Wilson fermions, is that they have a remnant chiral symmetry in the massless limit. The remnant symmetry is described in the spin-taste basis by

$$\psi_n \rightarrow e^{i\alpha \gamma_5\otimes \gamma_5}\psi_n, \ \ \ \ \ \ \ \bar \psi_n \rightarrow \bar \psi e^{i\alpha \gamma_5 \otimes \gamma_5}.$$

The presence of this remnant symmetry makes staggered fermions especially useful for certain applications since they can describe spontaneous symmetry breaking and anomalies. The symmetry also protects massless fermions from gaining a mass upon renormalization.

Staggered fermions are gauged in the one-component action by inserting link fields into the action to make it gauge invariant in the same way that this is done for the naive Dirac lattice action. This approach cannot be implemented in the spin-taste action directly. Instead the interacting single-component action must be used together with a modified spin-taste basis $\psi^{t}(h)_\alpha$ where Wilson lines are inserted between the different lattice points within the hypercube to ensure gauge invariance. The resulting action cannot be expressed in a closed form but can be expended out in powers of the lattice spacing, leading to the usual interacting Dirac action for four fermions, together with an infinite series of irrelevant fermion bilinear operators that vanish in the continuum limit.

=== Momentum-space staggered fermions ===
Staggered fermions can also be formulated in momentum space by transforming the single-component action into Fourier space and splitting up the Brillouin zone into sixteen blocks. Shifting these to the origin yields sixteen copies of the single-component fermion whose momenta extend over half the Brillouin zone range $-\pi/2\leq k_\mu \leq \pi/2$. These can be grouped into a $4\times 4$ matrix which upon a unitary transformation and a momentum rescaling, to ensure that the momenta again range over the full $[-\pi,\pi]$ Brillouin range, gives the momentum-space staggered fermion action

$$S = \int_{-\pi}^\pi \frac{d^4 p}{(2\pi)^4}\bar \psi(p) \bigg[2i\sum_\mu \sin\tfrac{p_\mu}{2}(\gamma_\mu \otimes 1) + 2m ( 1 \otimes 1)\bigg]\psi(p).$$

This can be transformed back into position space through an inverse Fourier transformation. In contrast to the spin-taste action, this action does not mix the taste components together, seemingly giving an action that fully separates out the four fermions. It therefore has a full $U(4) \otimes U(4)$ chiral symmetry group. This is however only achieved at the expense of locality, where now the position-space Dirac operator connects lattice points that are arbitrarily far apart, rather than ones restricted to a hypercube. This conclusion is also seen in the propagator which is discontinuous at the Brillouin zone edges.

The momentum-space and position-space formulations differ because they use a different definition of taste, whereby the momentum space definition does not correspond to the local definition in position space. These two definitions only become equivalent in the continuum limit. Chiral symmetry is maintained despite the possibility of simulating a single momentum space fermion because locality was one of the assumptions of the Nielsen–Ninomiya theorem determining whether a theory experiences fermion doubling. The loss of locality makes this formulation hard to use for simulations.

== Simulating staggered fermions ==
The main issue with simulating staggered fermions is that the different tastes mix together due to the taste-mixing term. If there was no mixing between tastes, lattice simulations could easily untangle the different contributions from the different tastes to end up with the results for processes involving a single fermion. Instead the taste mixing introduces discretization errors that are hard to account for.

Initially these discretization errors, of order $\mathcal O(a^2)$, were unusually large compared to other lattice fermions, making staggered fermions unpopular for simulations. The main method to reduce these errors is to perform Symanzik improvement, whereby irrelevant operators are added to the action with their coefficients fine-tuned to cancel discretization errors. The first such action was the ASQTAD action, with this being improved after analyzing one-loop taste exchange interactions to further eliminate $\mathcal O(a^2)$ errors using link-field smearing. This resulted in the highly improved staggered quark (HISQ) action and it forms the basis of modern staggered fermion simulations. Since simulations are done using the single-component action, simulating staggered fermions is very fast as this requires simulating only single-component Grassmann variables rather than four component spinors. The main code and gauge ensembles used for staggered fermions comes from the MILC collaboration.

An advantage of staggered fermions over some other lattice fermions in that the remnant chiral symmetry protects simulations from exceptional configurations, which are gauge field configurations that lead to small eigenvalues of the Dirac operator, making numerical inversion difficult. Staggered fermions are protected from this because their Dirac operator is anti-hermitian, so its eigenvalues come in complex conjugate pairs $m\pm i \lambda$ for real $\lambda$. This ensures that the Dirac determinant is real and positive for non-zero masses. Negative or imaginary determinants are problematic during Markov chain Monte Carlo simulations as the determinant is present in the probability weight.

=== Fourth-root trick ===
In the continuum limit the staggered fermion Dirac operator reduces to a four-fold continuum Dirac operator $D = D_1 \otimes 1$, so its eigenvalues are four-fold degenerate, hence $[\det D]^{1/4} = \det D_1$. This degeneracy is broken by taste mixing at non-zero lattice spacings $a\neq 0$, although simulations show that the eigenvalues are still roughly clustered in groups of four. This motivates the fourth-root trick where a single fermion is simulated by replacing the staggered Dirac operator determinant by its fourth root in the partition function

$$\int \mathcal D U \det[D_{\text{stag}}] e^{-S_{\text{gauge}}} \ \ \ \ \ \rightarrow \ \ \ \ \ \int \mathcal D U (\det [D_{\text{stag}}])^{1/4} e^{-S_{\text{gauge}}}.$$

The resulting fermion is called a rooted staggered fermion and it is used in most staggered fermion simulations, including by the MILC collaboration. The theoretical problem in using rooted staggered fermions is that it is unclear whether they give the correct continuum limit, that is whether rooting changes the universality class of the theory. If it does, then there is no reason to suppose that rooted staggered fermions are any good at describing the continuum field theory. The universality class is generally determined by the dimensionality of the theory and by what symmetries it satisfies. The problem with rooted staggered fermions is that they can only be described by a nonlocal action for which the universality classification no longer applies. As nonlocality implies a violation of unitary, rooted staggered fermions are also non-physical at non-zero lattice spacings, although this is not a problem if the nonlocality vanishes in the continuum. It has been found that under reasonable assumptions, the fourth root trick does define a renormalizable theory that at all orders in perturbation theory reproduces a local, unitary theory with the correct number of light quarks in the continuum. It remains an open question whether this is also true non-perturbatively, however theoretical arguments and numerical comparisons to other lattice fermions indicate that rooted staggered fermions do belong to the correct universality class.

== See also ==
- Lattice model
- Statistical field theory
