= Ginsparg–Wilson equation =

Lattice fermion discretisation

In lattice field theory, the Ginsparg–Wilson equation generalizes chiral symmetry on the lattice in a way that approaches the continuum formulation in the continuum limit. The class of fermions whose Dirac operators satisfy this equation are known as Ginsparg–Wilson fermions, with notable examples being overlap, domain wall and fixed point fermions. They are a means to avoid the fermion doubling problem, widely used for instance in lattice QCD calculations. The equation was discovered by Paul Ginsparg and Kenneth Wilson in 1982, however it was quickly forgotten about since there were no known solutions. It was only in 1997 and 1998 that the first solutions were found in the form of the overlap and fixed point fermions, at which point the equation entered prominence.

Ginsparg–Wilson fermions do not contradict the Nielsen–Ninomiya theorem because they explicitly violate chiral symmetry. More precisely, the continuum chiral symmetry relation $D\gamma_5+\gamma_5 D=0$ (where $D$ is the massless Dirac operator) is replaced by the Ginsparg–Wilson equation

$$D\gamma_5 + \gamma_5 D = a\,D\gamma_5 D\,$$

which recovers the correct continuum expression as the lattice spacing $a$ goes to zero.

In contrast to Wilson fermions, Ginsparg–Wilson fermions do not modify the inverse fermion propagator additively but multiplicatively, thus lifting the unphysical poles at $p_\mu = \pi/a$. The exact form of this modification depends on the individual realisation.
