= Domain wall fermion =

Lattice fermion discretisation

In lattice field theory, domain wall (DW) fermions are a fermion discretization avoiding the fermion doubling problem. They are a realisation of Ginsparg–Wilson fermions in the infinite separation limit $L_s\rightarrow\infty$ where they become equivalent to overlap fermions. DW fermions have undergone numerous improvements since Kaplan's original formulation such as the reinterpretation by Shamir and the generalisation to Möbius DW fermions by Brower, Neff and Orginos.

The original $d$-dimensional Euclidean spacetime is lifted into $d+1$ dimensions. The additional dimension of length $L_s$ has open boundary conditions and the so-called domain walls form its boundaries. The physics is now found to ″live″ on the domain walls and the doublers are located on opposite walls, that is at $L_s\rightarrow\infty$ they completely decouple from the system.

Kaplan's (and equivalently Shamir's) DW Dirac operator is defined by two addends

$$D_\text{DW}(x,s;y,r) = D(x;y)\delta_{sr} + \delta_{xy}D_{d+1}(s;r)\,$$

with

$$D_{d+1}(s;r) = \delta_{sr} - (1-\delta_{s,L_s-1})P_-\delta_{s+1,r} - (1-\delta_{s0})P_+\delta_{s-1,r} + m\left(P_-\delta_{s,L_s-1}\delta_{0r} + P_+\delta_{s0}\delta_{L_s-1,r}\right)\,$$

where $P_\pm=(\mathbf1\pm\gamma_5)/2$ is the chiral projection operator and $D$ is the canonical Dirac operator in $d$ dimensions. $x$ and $y$ are (multi-)indices in the physical space whereas $s$ and $r$ denote the position in the additional dimension.

DW fermions do not contradict the Nielsen–Ninomiya theorem because they explicitly violate chiral symmetry (asymptotically obeying the Ginsparg–Wilson equation).
