= Overlap fermion =

Lattice fermion discretisation

In lattice field theory, overlap fermions are a fermion discretization that allows to avoid the fermion doubling problem. They are a realisation of Ginsparg–Wilson fermions.

Initially introduced by Neuberger in 1998, they were quickly taken up for a variety of numerical simulations. By now overlap fermions are well established and regularly used in non-perturbative fermion simulations, for instance in lattice QCD.

Overlap fermions with mass $m$ are defined on a Euclidean spacetime lattice with spacing $a$ by the overlap Dirac operator

$$D_{\text{ov}} = \frac1a \left(\left(1+am\right) \mathbf{1} + \left(1-am\right)\gamma_5 \mathrm{sign}[\gamma_5 A]\right)\,$$

where $A$ is the ″kernel″ Dirac operator obeying $\gamma_5 A = A^\dagger\gamma_5$, i.e. $A$ is $\gamma_5$-hermitian. The sign-function usually has to be calculated numerically, e.g. by rational approximations. A common choice for the kernel is

$$A = aD - \mathbf 1(1+s)\,$$

where $D$ is the massless Dirac operator and $s\in\left(-1,1\right)$ is a free parameter that can be tuned to optimise locality of $D_\text{ov}$.

Near $pa=0$ the overlap Dirac operator recovers the correct continuum form (using the Feynman slash notation)

$$D_\text{ov} = m+i\, {p\!\!\!/}\frac{1}{1+s}+\mathcal{O}(a)\,$$

whereas the unphysical doublers near $pa=\pi$ are suppressed by a high mass

$$D_\text{ov} = \frac1a+m+i\,{p\!\!\!/}\frac{1}{1-s}+\mathcal{O}(a)$$

and decouple.

Overlap fermions do not contradict the Nielsen–Ninomiya theorem because they explicitly violate chiral symmetry (obeying the Ginsparg–Wilson equation) and locality.
