= Twisted mass fermion =

Lattice fermion discretisation

In lattice field theory, twisted mass fermions are a fermion discretization that extends Wilson fermions for two mass-degenerate fermions. They are well established and regularly used in non-perturbative fermion simulations, for instance in lattice QCD.

The original motivation for the use of twisted mass fermions in lattice QCD simulations was the observation that the two lightest quarks (up and down) have very similar mass and can therefore be approximated with the same (degenerate) mass. They form a so-called isospin doublet and are both represented by Wilson fermions in the twisted mass formalism. The name-giving twisted mass is used as a numerical trick, assigned to the two quarks with opposite signs. It acts as an infrared regulator, that is it allows to avoid unphysical configurations at low energies. In addition, at vanishing physical mass $m=0$ (maximal or full twist) it allows $\mathcal{O}(a)$ improvement, getting rid of leading order lattice artifacts linear in the lattice spacing $a$.

The twisted mass Dirac operator is constructed from the (massive) Wilson Dirac operator $D_W$ and reads

$$D_\text{tw} = D_W + i\mu\gamma_5\sigma_3$$

where $\mu$ is the twisted mass and acts as an infrared regulator (all eigenvalues $\lambda$ of $D_\text{tw}$ obey $\lambda\ge\mu^2>0$). $\sigma_3$ is the third Pauli matrix acting in the flavour space spanned by the two fermions. In the continuum limit $a\rightarrow0$ the twisted mass becomes irrelevant in the physical sector and only appears in the doubler sectors which decouple due to the use of Wilson fermions.
