= Fermion doubling =

Putting fermions on a lattice with chiral symmetry results in more fermions than expected

In lattice field theory, fermion doubling occurs when naively putting fermionic fields on a lattice, resulting in more fermionic states than expected. For the naively discretized Dirac fermions in $d$ Euclidean dimensions, each fermionic field results in $2^d$ identical fermion species, referred to as different tastes of the fermion. The fermion doubling problem is intractably linked to chiral invariance by the Nielsen–Ninomiya theorem. Most strategies used to solve the problem require using modified fermions which reduce to the Dirac fermion only in the continuum limit.

== Naive fermion discretization ==
For simplicity we will consider a four-dimensional theory of a free fermion, although the fermion doubling problem remains in arbitrary dimensions and even if interactions are included. Lattice field theory is usually carried out in Euclidean spacetime arrived at from Minkowski spacetime after a Wick rotation, where the continuum Dirac action takes the form

$$S_F[\psi, \bar \psi] = \int d^4x\bar \psi(x)(\gamma^\mu \partial_\mu + m)\psi(x).$$

This is discretized by introducing a lattice with lattice spacing $a$ and points indexed by a vector of integers $n = (n_1,n_2,n_3,n_4)$. The integral becomes a sum over all lattice points, while the fermionic fields are replaced by four-component Grassmann variables at each lattice site denoted by $\psi_n$ and $\bar \psi_n$. The derivative discretization used is the symmetric derivative discretization, with the vectors $\hat \mu$ being unit vectors in the $\mu$ direction. These steps give the naive free fermion action

$$S_F^L[\psi, \bar \psi] = a^4 \sum_n \bar \psi_n \bigg(\sum^4_{\mu=1} \gamma_\mu \frac{\psi_{n+\hat \mu}-\psi_{n-\hat \mu}}{2a}+m\psi_n\bigg).$$

This action reduces down to the continuum Dirac action in the continuum limit, so is expect to be a theory of a single fermion. However, it instead describes sixteen identical fermions, with each fermion said to have a different taste, analogously to how particles have different flavours in particle physics. The fifteen additional fermions are often referred to as doublers. This extended particle content can be seen by analyzing the symmetries or the correlation functions of the lattice theory.

=== Doubling symmetry ===
The naive fermion action possesses a new taste-exchange symmetry not found in the continuum theory acting on the fermion fields as

$$\psi_n \rightarrow e^{-in\cdot \pi_A}S_A \psi_n, \ \ \ \ \ \ \bar \psi_n \rightarrow \bar \psi_n S_A^\dagger e^{in\cdot \pi_A},$$

where the vectors $\pi_A$ are the sixteen vectors with non-zero entries of $\pi$ specified by $A$. For example, $\pi_0 = (0,0,0,0)$, $\pi_{2} = (0,\pi,0,0)$, $\pi_{14} = (\pi,0,0,\pi)$, and $\pi_{1234} = (\pi,\pi,\pi,\pi)$. The Dirac structure in the symmetry is similarly defined by the indices of $A$ as $S_A = S_{\nu_1}S_{\nu_2}S_{\nu_3}S_{\nu_4}$ where $S_0 = I$ and $S_\nu = i\gamma_5 \gamma_\nu$; for example with $S_{14} = (i\gamma_5 \gamma_1)(i\gamma_5\gamma_4)$.

The presence of these sixteen symmetry transformations implies the existence of sixteen identical fermion states rather than just one. Starting with a fermion field $\psi_n$, the symmetry maps it to another field $\psi'_n = e^{-in\cdot \pi_A}S_A\psi_n$. Fourier transforming this shows that its momentum has been shifted as $p^\mu \rightarrow p^\mu + \pi_A^\mu$. Therefore, a fermion with momentum near the center of the Brillouin zone is mapped to one of its corners while one of the corner fermions comes in to replace the center fermion, showing that the transformation acts to exchange the tastes of the fermions. Since this is a symmetry of the action, the different tastes must be physically indistinguishable from each other. Here the Brillouin momentum $k^\mu = p^\mu+ \pi_A^\mu$ for small $p^\mu$ is not the physical momentum of the particle, rather that is $p^\mu$. Instead $\pi_A^\mu$ acts more as an additional quantum number specifying the taste of a fermion.

The $S_A$ term is responsible for changing the representation of the $\gamma$-matrices of the doublers to $\gamma_\mu^{(A)} = S_A^\dagger \gamma_\mu S_A$, which has the effect of changing the signs of the matrices as $(\gamma_1, \gamma_2, \gamma_3, \gamma_4) \rightarrow (\pm \gamma_1, \pm \gamma_2, \pm \gamma_3, \pm \gamma_4)$. Since any such sign change results in a set of matrices still satisfying the Dirac algebra, the resulting matrices form a valid representation. It is also the term that enters the wave function of the doublers given by $S_A^\dagger u(\boldsymbol p)$ and $S^\dagger_A v(\boldsymbol p)$, where $u(\boldsymbol p)$ and $v(\boldsymbol p)$ are the usual Dirac equation solutions with momentum $\boldsymbol p$.

=== Propagator and dispersion relation ===
In the continuum theory, the Dirac propagator has a single pole as the theory describes only a single particle. However, calculating the propagator from the naive action yields

$$S(p) = \frac{m - ia^{-1}\sum_\mu \gamma_\mu \sin(p^\mu a)}{m^2+a^{-2}\sum_\mu \sin(p^\mu a)^2},$$

for a fermion with momentum $p^\mu$. For low momenta $\sin(p^\mu a)\approx p^\mu a$ this still has the expected pole at $ap^\mu = (am,0,0,0)$, but there are fifteen additional poles when $ap^\mu = (am,0,0,0)+\pi_A^\mu$. Each of these is a new fermion species with doubling arising because the $\sin(p^\mu a)$ function has two poles over the range $p^\mu \in [-\pi/a,\pi/a]$. This is in contrast to what happens when particles of different spins are discretized. For example, scalars acquire propagators taking a similar form except with $\sin(p^\mu a/2)$, which only has a single pole over the momentum range and so the theory does not suffer from a doubling problem.

Comparison between the continuum and lattice dispersion relations of a free fermion, with the latter having a doubler at the Brillouin zone boundary.

The necessity of fermion doubling can be deduced from the fact that the massless fermion propagator is odd around the origin. That is, in the continuum limit it is proportional to $\gamma_\mu p^\mu$, which must still be the case on the lattice in the small momentum limit. But since any local lattice theory that can be constructed must have a propagator that is continuous and periodic, it must cross the zero axis at least once more, which is exactly what occurs on the Brillouin zone corners where $ap_\mu = \pi_A^\mu$ for the naive fermion propagator. This is in contrast to the bosonic propagator which is quadratic around the origin and so does not have such problem. Doubling can be avoided if a discontinuous propagator is used, but this results in a non-local theory.

The presence of doublers is also reflected in the fermion dispersion relation. Since this is a relation between the energy $\omega$ of the fermion and its momentum, it requires performing an inverse Wick transformation $p_4 = \pm i \omega$, with the dispersion relation arising from the pole of the propagator

$$\sinh \omega(\boldsymbol p) = \sqrt{m^2 + \sum^3_{j=1}\sin^2 p_j}.$$

The zeros of this dispersion relation are local energy minima around which excitations correspond to different particle species. The above has eight different species arising due to doubling in the three spatial directions. The remaining eight doublers occur due to another doubling in the Euclidean temporal direction, which seems to have been lost. But this is due to a naive application of the inverse Wick transformation. The theory has an obstruction that does not allow for the simple replacement of $p_4 = \pm i \omega$ and instead requires performing the full contour integration. Doing this for the position space propagator results in two separate terms, each of which has the same dispersion relation of eight fermion species, giving a total of sixteen. The obstruction between the Minkowski and Euclidean naive fermion lattice theories occurs because doubling does not occur in the Minkowski temporal direction, so the two theories differ in their particle content.

== Resolutions to fermion doubling ==
Fermion doubling is a consequence of a no-go theorem in lattice field theory known as the Nielsen–Ninomiya theorem. It states that any even dimensional local, hermitian, translationally invariant, bilinear fermionic theory always has the same number of left-handed and right-handed Weyl fermions, generating the additional fermions when they are lacking. The theorem does not say how many doublers will arise, but without breaking the assumptions of the theorem, there will always be at least one doubler, with the naive discretization having fifteen. A consequence of the theorem is that the chiral anomaly cannot be simulated with chirally invariant theories as it trivially vanishes.

Simulating lattice field theories with fermion doubling leads to incorrect results due to the doublers, so many strategies to overcome this problem have been developed. While doublers can be ignored in a free theory as there the different tastes decouple, they cannot be ignored in an interacting theory where interactions mix different tastes, since momentum is conserved only up to modulo $2\pi$. For example, two $\pi_0$ taste fermions can scatter by the exchange of a highly virtual gauge boson to produce two $\pi_1$ taste fermions without violating momentum conservation. Therefore, to overcome the fermion doubling problem, one must violate one or more assumptions of the Nielsen–Ninomiya theorem, giving rise to a multitude of proposed resolutions:

- Domain wall fermion: explicitly violates chiral symmetry, increases spatial dimensionality.
- Ginsparg–Wilson fermion: explicitly violates chiral symmetry.
- Overlap fermion: explicitly violates chiral symmetry (type of Ginsparg–Wilson fermion).
- Perfect lattice fermion: nonlocal formulation.
- SLAC fermion: nonlocal formulation.
- Stacey fermion: nonlocal formulation.
- Staggered fermion (Kogut–Susskind fermion): explicitly violates translational invariance, reduces number of doublers.
- Symmetric mass generation: This approach goes beyond the fermion-bilinear model and introduces non-perturbative interaction effects. One realization based on the Eichten–Preskill model starts from a vector-symmetric fermion model where chiral fermions and mirror fermions are realized on two domain walls. Gapping the mirror fermion using symmetric mass generation results in chiral fermions at low energy with no fermion doubling.
- Twisted mass fermion: explicitly violates chiral symmetry (type of Wilson fermion).
- Wilson fermion: explicitly violates chiral symmetry.

These fermion formulations each have their own advantages and disadvantages. They differ in the speed at which they can be simulated, the easy of their implementation, and the presence or absence of exceptional configurations. Some of them have a residual chiral symmetry allowing one to simulate axial anomalies. They can also differ in how many of the doublers they eliminate, with some consisting of a doublet, or a quartet of fermions. For this reason different fermion formulations are used for different problems.

=== Derivative discretization ===
Another possible although impractical solution to the doubling problem is to adopt a derivative discretization different from the symmetric difference

$$\partial_\mu f(x) \rightarrow \lim_{a\rightarrow 0} \frac{f(x+a\hat \mu)-f(x-a\hat \mu)}{2a},$$

used in the naive fermion action. Instead it is possible to use the forward difference

$$\partial_\mu f(x) \rightarrow \lim_{a\rightarrow 0}\frac{f(x+a\hat \mu)-f(x)}{a},$$

or a backward difference discretizations. The effect of the derivative discretizations on doubling is seen by considering the one-dimensional toy problem of finding the eigensolutions of $-i\partial_x f(x) = \lambda f(x)$. In the continuum this differential equation has a single solution. However, implementing the symmetric difference derivative leads to the presence of two distinct eigensolutions, while a forward or backward difference derivative has one eigensolution. This effect carries forward to the fermion action where fermion doubling is absent with forward or backward discretizations.

The reason for this particle content disparity is that the symmetric difference derivative maintains the hermiticity property of the continuum $i\partial_\mu$ operator, while the forward and backward discretizations do not. These latter discretizations lead to non-hermitian actions, breaking the assumptions of the Nielsen–Ninomiya theorem, and so avoid the fermion doubling problem. Developing an interacting theory with a non-hermitian derivative discretization leads to a theory with non-covariant contributions to the fermion self-energy and vertex function, rendering the theory non-renormalizable and difficult to work with. For this reason such a resolution to the fermion doubling problem is generally not implemented.

== See also ==
- Acoustic and optical phonons: a similar phenomenon in solid state crystals
