= Plane-wave solutions to the Dirac equation =

Complex four-component spinor

In quantum field theory, plane-wave solutions to the Dirac equation, are standard basis solutions to the Dirac equation describing the propagation of Dirac spinors. These are spinors that describe all known fundamental particles that are fermions, with the possible exception of neutrinos. They are a certain combination of two Weyl spinors, that transforms "spinorially" under the action of the Lorentz group. For each momentum value $p$, the four basis plane-wave solutions are commonly labeled as $u^s(p)$ and $v^s(p)$, where $s$ is a spin index, taking two possible values for the spin up and spin down states.

Dirac spinors are important and interesting in numerous ways. Foremost, they are important as they do describe all of the known fundamental particle fermions in nature; this includes the electron and the quarks. Algebraically they behave, in a certain sense, as the "square root" of a vector. This is not readily apparent from direct examination, but it has slowly become clear over the last 60 years that spinorial representations are fundamental to geometry. For example, effectively all Riemannian manifolds can have spinors and spin connections built upon them, via the Clifford algebra. The Dirac spinor is specific to that of Minkowski spacetime and Lorentz transformations; the general case is quite similar.

This article is devoted to the Dirac spinor in the Dirac representation. This corresponds to a specific representation of the gamma matrices, and is best suited for demonstrating the positive and negative energy solutions of the Dirac equation. There are other representations, most notably the chiral representation, which is better suited for demonstrating the chiral symmetry of the solutions to the Dirac equation. The chiral spinors may be written as linear combinations of the Dirac spinors presented below; thus, nothing is lost or gained, other than a change in perspective with regard to the discrete symmetries of the solutions.

The remainder of this article focuses primarily on the algebra of the plane-wave solutions. The manner in which the Dirac spinor transforms under the action of the Lorentz group is discussed in the article on Dirac spinors.

== Definition ==
The Dirac spinor $u\left(\mathbf{p}\right)$ in the plane-wave ansatz
$$\psi(x) = u\left(\mathbf{p}\right)\; e^{-i p \cdot x}$$
of the free Dirac equation for a spinor with mass $m$,
$$\left(i\hbar\gamma^\mu \partial_\mu - mc\right)\psi(x) = 0$$
which, in natural units becomes
$$\left(i\gamma^\mu \partial_\mu - m\right)\psi(x) = 0$$
and with Feynman slash notation may be written
$$\left(i\partial\!\!\!/ - m\right)\psi(x) = 0$$

An explanation of terms appearing in the ansatz is given below.

- The Dirac field is $\psi(x)$, a relativistic spin-1/2 field, or concretely a function on Minkowski space $\mathbb{R}^{1,3}$ valued in $\mathbb{C}^4$, a four-component complex vector function.
- The Dirac spinor related to a plane-wave with wave-vector $\mathbf{p}$ is $u\left(\mathbf{p}\right)$, a $\mathbb{C}^4$ vector which is constant with respect to position in spacetime but dependent on momentum $\mathbf{p}$.
- The inner product on Minkowski space for vectors $p$ and $x$ is $p \cdot x \equiv p_\mu x^\mu \equiv E_\mathbf{p} t - \mathbf{p} \cdot \mathbf{x}$.
- The four-momentum of a plane wave is $p^\mu = \left(\pm\sqrt{m^2 + \mathbf{p}^2},\, \mathbf{p}\right) := \left(\pm E_\mathbf{p}, \mathbf{p}\right)$ where $\mathbf{p}$ is arbitrary,
- In a given inertial frame of reference, the coordinates are $x^\mu$. These coordinates parametrize Minkowski space. In this article, when $x^\mu$ appears in an argument, the index is sometimes omitted.

The Dirac spinor for the positive-frequency solution can be written as
$$u\left(\mathbf{p}\right) = \begin{bmatrix}
\phi \\ \frac{\boldsymbol{\sigma} \cdot \mathbf{p}}{E_\mathbf{p} + m} \phi
\end{bmatrix} \,,$$
where

- $\phi$ is an arbitrary two-spinor, concretely a $\mathbb{C}^2$ vector.
- $\boldsymbol{\sigma}$ is the Pauli vector,
- $E_\mathbf{p}$ is the positive square root $E_\mathbf{p} = + \sqrt{m^2 + \mathbf{p}^2}$. For this article, the $\mathbf{p}$ subscript is sometimes omitted and the energy simply written $E$.

In natural units, when m^{2} is added to p^{2} or when m is added to ${p\!\!\!/}$, m means mc in ordinary units; when m is added to E, m means mc^{2} in ordinary units. When m is added to $\partial_\mu$ or to $\nabla$ it means $\frac{mc}{\hbar}$ (which is called the inverse reduced Compton wavelength) in ordinary units.

== Derivation from Dirac equation ==
The Dirac equation has the form
$$\left(-i \boldsymbol{\alpha} \cdot \boldsymbol{\nabla} + \beta m \right) \psi = i \frac{\partial \psi}{\partial t}$$

In order to derive an expression for the four-spinor ω, the matrices α and β must be given in concrete form. The precise form that they take is representation-dependent. For the entirety of this article, the Dirac representation is used. In this representation, the matrices are
$$\boldsymbol\alpha = \begin{bmatrix}
0_2 & \boldsymbol{\sigma} \\
\boldsymbol{\sigma} & 0_2
\end{bmatrix} \quad \quad
\beta = \begin{bmatrix}
I_2 & 0_2 \\
0_2 & -I_2
\end{bmatrix}$$

These two 4×4 matrices are related to the Dirac gamma matrices. Note that 0_{2} is the 2x2 zero matrix and I_{2} is the 2x2 identity matrix.

The next step is to look for solutions of the form
$$\psi = \omega e^{-i p \cdot x} = \omega e^{ -i \left(E t - \mathbf{p} \cdot \mathbf{x}\right) },$$
while at the same time splitting ω into two two-spinors:
$$\omega = \begin{bmatrix} \phi \\ \chi \end{bmatrix} \,.$$

=== Results ===
Using all of the above information to plug into the Dirac equation results in
$$E \begin{bmatrix}
\phi \\
\chi
\end{bmatrix} =
\begin{bmatrix}
m I_2 & \boldsymbol{\sigma}\cdot\mathbf{p} \\
\boldsymbol{\sigma}\cdot\mathbf{p} & -m I_2
\end{bmatrix}\begin{bmatrix}
\phi \\
\chi
\end{bmatrix}.$$
This matrix equation is really two coupled equations:
$$\begin{align}
\left(E - m \right) \phi &= \left(\boldsymbol{\sigma} \cdot \mathbf{p} \right) \chi \\
\left(E + m \right) \chi &= \left(\boldsymbol{\sigma} \cdot \mathbf{p} \right) \phi
\end{align}$$

Solve the 2nd equation for χ and one obtains
$$\omega = \begin{bmatrix}
\phi \\
\frac{\boldsymbol{\sigma} \cdot \mathbf{p}}{E + m} \phi
\end{bmatrix} .$$

Note that this solution needs to have $E = +\sqrt{\mathbf p^2 + m^2}$ in order for the solution to be valid in a frame where the particle has $\mathbf p = \mathbf 0$.

To derive the sign of the energy in this case, we consider the potentially problematic term $\frac{\boldsymbol\sigma\cdot \mathbf{p}}{E + m} \phi$.

- If $E = +\sqrt{p^2 + m^2}$, clearly $\frac{\boldsymbol\sigma\cdot\mathbf p}{E + m} \rightarrow 0$ as $\mathbf p \rightarrow \mathbf 0$.
- On the other hand, let $E = -\sqrt{p^2 + m^2}$, $\mathbf p = p\hat{n}$ with $\hat n$ a unit vector, and let $p \rightarrow 0$.

$$\begin{align}
E = -m\sqrt{1 + \frac{p^2}{m^2}} &\rightarrow -m\left(1 + \frac{1}{2}\frac{p^2}{m^2}\right) \\
\frac{\boldsymbol\sigma\cdot\mathbf p}{E + m} &\rightarrow p\frac{\boldsymbol\sigma\cdot\hat n}{-m - \frac{p^2}{2m} + m} \propto \frac{1}{p} \rightarrow \infty
\end{align}$$

Hence the negative solution clearly has to be omitted, and $E = +\sqrt{p^2 + m^2}$. End derivation.

Assembling these pieces, the full positive energy solution is conventionally written as
$$\psi^{(+)} = u^{(\phi)}(\mathbf p)e^{-i p \cdot x} = \textstyle \sqrt{\frac{E + m}{2m}} \begin{bmatrix}
\phi \\
\frac{\boldsymbol{\sigma} \cdot \mathbf{p}}{E + m} \phi
\end{bmatrix} e^{-i p \cdot x}$$
The above introduces a normalization factor $\sqrt{\frac{E+m}{2m}},$ derived in the next section.

Solving instead the 1st equation for $\phi$ a different set of solutions are found:
$$\omega = \begin{bmatrix} -\frac{\boldsymbol{\sigma} \cdot \mathbf{p}}{-E + m} \chi \\ \chi \end{bmatrix} \,.$$

In this case, one needs to enforce that $E = -\sqrt{\mathbf p^2 + m^2}$ for this solution to be valid in a frame where the particle has $\mathbf p = \mathbf 0$. The proof follows analogously to the previous case. This is the so-called negative energy solution. It can sometimes become confusing to carry around an explicitly negative energy, and so it is conventional to flip the sign on both the energy and the momentum, and to write this as
$$\psi^{(-)} = v^{(\chi)}(\mathbf p) e^{i p \cdot x} = \textstyle\sqrt{\frac{E + m}{2m}} \begin{bmatrix}
\frac{\boldsymbol{\sigma} \cdot \mathbf{p}}{E + m} \chi \\ \chi
\end{bmatrix} e^{i p \cdot x}$$

In further development, the $\psi^{(+)}$-type solutions are referred to as the particle solutions, describing a positive-mass spin-1/2 particle carrying positive energy, and the $\psi^{(-)}$-type solutions are referred to as the antiparticle solutions, again describing a positive-mass spin-1/2 particle, again carrying positive energy. In the laboratory frame, both are considered to have positive mass and positive energy, although they are still very much dual to each other, with the flipped sign on the antiparticle plane-wave suggesting that it is "travelling backwards in time". The interpretation of "backwards-time" is a bit subjective and imprecise, amounting to hand-waving when one's only evidence are these solutions. It does gain stronger evidence when considering the quantized Dirac field. A more precise meaning for these two sets of solutions being "opposite to each other" is given in the section on charge conjugation, below.

== Spin orientation ==
=== Two-spinors ===
In the Dirac representation, the most convenient definitions for the two-spinors are:
$$\phi^1 = \begin{bmatrix} 1 \\ 0 \end{bmatrix} \quad \quad
\phi^2 = \begin{bmatrix} 0 \\ 1 \end{bmatrix}$$
and
$$\chi^1 = \begin{bmatrix} 0 \\ 1 \end{bmatrix} \quad \quad
\chi^2 = \begin{bmatrix} 1 \\ 0 \end{bmatrix}$$
since these form an orthonormal basis with respect to a (complex) inner product.

=== Pauli matrices ===
The Pauli matrices are
$$\sigma_1 = \begin{bmatrix}
0 & 1\\
1 & 0
\end{bmatrix} \quad \quad
\sigma_2 = \begin{bmatrix}
0 & -i \\
i &  0
\end{bmatrix} \quad \quad
\sigma_3 =
\begin{bmatrix}
1 &  0 \\
0 & -1
\end{bmatrix}$$

Using these, one obtains what is sometimes called the Pauli vector:
$$\boldsymbol{\sigma}\cdot\mathbf{p} = \sigma_1 p_1 + \sigma_2 p_2 + \sigma_3 p_3 =
\begin{bmatrix}
p_3         & p_1 - i p_2 \\
p_1 + i p_2 & - p_3
\end{bmatrix}$$

== Orthogonality ==
The Dirac spinors provide a complete and orthogonal set of solutions to the Dirac equation. This is most easily demonstrated by writing the spinors in the rest frame, where this becomes obvious, and then boosting to an arbitrary Lorentz coordinate frame. In the rest frame, where the three-momentum vanishes: $\mathbf p = \mathbf 0,$ one may define four spinors
$$u^{(1)}\left(\mathbf{0}\right) =
\begin{bmatrix}
1 \\
0 \\
0 \\
0
\end{bmatrix}
\qquad
u^{(2)}\left(\mathbf{0}\right) =
\begin{bmatrix}
0 \\
1 \\
0 \\
0
\end{bmatrix}
\qquad
v^{(1)}\left(\mathbf{0}\right) =
\begin{bmatrix}
0 \\
0 \\
1 \\
0
\end{bmatrix}
\qquad
v^{(2)}\left(\mathbf{0}\right) =
\begin{bmatrix}
0 \\
0 \\
0 \\
1
\end{bmatrix}$$

Introducing the Feynman slash notation
$${p\!\!\!/} = \gamma^\mu p_\mu$$

the boosted spinors can be written as
$$u^{(s)}\left(\mathbf{p}\right) =
\frac{{p\!\!\!/} + m}{\sqrt{2m(E+m)}} u^{(s)}\left(\mathbf{0}\right)
= \textstyle \sqrt{\frac{E+m}{2m}}
\begin{bmatrix}
\phi^{(s)}\\
\frac {\boldsymbol\sigma \cdot \mathbf p} {E+m} \phi^{(s)}
\end{bmatrix}$$
and
$$v^{(s)}\left(\mathbf{p}\right) =
\frac{-{p\!\!\!/} + m}{\sqrt{2m(E+m)}} v^{(s)}\left(\mathbf{0}\right)
= \textstyle \sqrt{\frac{E+m}{2m}}
\begin{bmatrix}
\frac {\boldsymbol\sigma \cdot \mathbf p} {E+m} \chi^{(s)} \\
\chi^{(s)}
\end{bmatrix}$$

The conjugate spinors are defined as $\overline \psi = \psi^\dagger \gamma^0$ which may be shown to solve the conjugate Dirac equation
$$\overline \psi (i{\partial\!\!\!/} + m) = 0$$

with the derivative understood to be acting towards the left. The conjugate spinors are then
$$\overline u^{(s)}\left(\mathbf{p}\right) =
\overline u^{(s)}\left(\mathbf{0}\right) \frac{{p\!\!\!/} + m}{\sqrt{2m(E+m)}}$$
and
$$\overline v^{(s)}\left(\mathbf{p}\right) =
\overline v^{(s)}\left(\mathbf{0}\right) \frac{-{p\!\!\!/} + m}{\sqrt{2m(E+m)}}$$

The normalization chosen here is such that the scalar invariant $\overline\psi \psi$ really is invariant in all Lorentz frames. Specifically, this means
$$\begin{align}
\overline u^{(a)} (p) u^{(b)} (p) &=  \delta_{ab} & \overline u^{(a)} (p) v^{(b)} (p) &= 0 \\
\overline v^{(a)} (p) v^{(b)} (p) &= -\delta_{ab} & \overline v^{(a)} (p) u^{(b)} (p) &= 0
\end{align}$$

== Completeness ==
The four rest-frame spinors $u^{(s)}\left(\mathbf{0}\right),$ $\;v^{(s)}\left(\mathbf{0}\right)$ indicate that there are four distinct, real, linearly independent solutions to the Dirac equation. That they are indeed solutions can be made clear by observing that, when written in momentum space, the Dirac equation has the form
$$({p\!\!\!/} - m)u^{(s)}\left(\mathbf{p}\right) = 0$$
and
$$({p\!\!\!/} + m)v^{(s)}\left(\mathbf{p}\right) = 0$$

This follows because
$${p\!\!\!/}{p\!\!\!/} = p^\mu p_\mu = m^2$$
which in turn follows from the anti-commutation relations for the gamma matrices:
$$\left\{\gamma^\mu, \gamma^\nu\right\} = 2\eta^{\mu\nu}$$
with $\eta^{\mu\nu}$ the metric tensor in flat space (in curved space, the gamma matrices can be viewed as being a kind of vielbein, although this is beyond the scope of the current article). It is perhaps useful to note that the Dirac equation, written in the rest frame, takes the form
$$\left(\gamma^0 - 1\right)u^{(s)}\left(\mathbf{0}\right) = 0$$
and
$$\left(\gamma^0 + 1\right)v^{(s)}\left(\mathbf{0}\right) = 0$$
so that the rest-frame spinors can correctly be interpreted as solutions to the Dirac equation. There are four equations here, not eight. Although 4-spinors are written as four complex numbers, thus suggesting 8 real variables, only four of them have dynamical independence; the other four have no significance and can always be parameterized away. That is, one could take each of the four vectors $u^{(s)}\left(\mathbf{0}\right),$ $\;v^{(s)}\left(\mathbf{0}\right)$ and multiply each by a distinct global phase $e^{i\eta}.$ This phase changes nothing; it can be interpreted as a kind of global gauge freedom. This is not to say that "phases don't matter", as of course they do; the Dirac equation must be written in complex form, and the phases couple to electromagnetism. Phases even have a physical significance, as the Aharonov–Bohm effect implies: the Dirac field, coupled to electromagnetism, is a U(1) fiber bundle (the circle bundle), and the Aharonov–Bohm effect demonstrates the holonomy of that bundle. All this has no direct impact on the counting of the number of distinct components of the Dirac field. In any setting, there are only four real, distinct components.

With an appropriate choice of the gamma matrices, it is possible to write the Dirac equation in a purely real form, having only real solutions: this is the Majorana equation. However, it has only two linearly independent solutions. These solutions do not couple to electromagnetism; they describe a massive, electrically neutral spin-1/2 particle. Apparently, coupling to electromagnetism doubles the number of solutions. But of course, this makes sense: coupling to electromagnetism requires taking a real field, and making it complex. With some effort, the Dirac equation can be interpreted as the "complexified" Majorana equation. This is most easily demonstrated in a generic geometrical setting, outside the scope of this article.

== Energy eigenstate projection matrices ==
It is conventional to define a pair of projection matrices $\Lambda_{+}$ and $\Lambda_{-}$, that project out the positive and negative energy eigenstates. Given a fixed Lorentz coordinate frame (i.e. a fixed momentum), these are
$$\begin{align}
\Lambda_{+}(p) = \sum_{s=1,2}{u^{(s)}_p \otimes \bar{u}^{(s)}_p} &= \frac{{p\!\!\!/} + m}{2m} \\
\Lambda_{-}(p) = -\sum_{s=1,2}{v^{(s)}_p \otimes \bar{v}^{(s)}_p} &= \frac{-{p\!\!\!/} + m}{2m}
\end{align}$$

These are a pair of 4×4 matrices. They sum to the identity matrix:
$$\Lambda_{+}(p) + \Lambda_{-}(p) = I$$
are orthogonal
$$\Lambda_{+}(p) \Lambda_{-}(p) = \Lambda_{-}(p) \Lambda_{+}(p)= 0$$
and are idempotent
$$\Lambda_{\pm}(p) \Lambda_{\pm}(p) = \Lambda_{\pm}(p)$$

It is convenient to notice their trace:
$$\operatorname{tr} \Lambda_{\pm}(p) = 2$$

Note that the trace, and the orthonormality properties hold independent of the Lorentz frame; these are Lorentz covariants.

== Charge conjugation ==
Charge conjugation transforms the positive-energy spinor into the negative-energy spinor. Charge conjugation is a mapping (an involution) $\psi\mapsto\psi_c$ having the explicit form
$$\psi_c = \eta C \left(\overline\psi\right)^\textsf{T}$$
where $(\cdot)^\textsf{T}$ denotes the transpose, $C$ is a 4×4 matrix, and $\eta$ is an arbitrary phase factor, $\eta^*\eta = 1.$ The article on charge conjugation derives the above form, and demonstrates why the word "charge" is the appropriate word to use: it can be interpreted as the electrical charge. In the Dirac representation for the gamma matrices, the matrix $C$ can be written as
$$C = i\gamma^2\gamma^0 =
\begin{pmatrix}
0 & -i\sigma_2 \\
-i\sigma_2 & 0
\end{pmatrix}$$
Thus, a positive-energy solution (dropping the spin superscript to avoid notational overload)
$$\psi^{(+)} = u\left(\mathbf{p}\right) e^{-ip\cdot x}
= \textstyle \sqrt{\frac{E + m}{2m}}
\begin{bmatrix}
\phi\\
\frac{\boldsymbol{\sigma} \cdot \mathbf{p}}{E + m} \phi
\end{bmatrix}
e^{-ip\cdot x}$$
is carried to its charge conjugate
$$\psi^{(+)}_c
= \textstyle \sqrt{\frac{E + m}{2m}}
\begin{bmatrix}
i\sigma_2 \frac{\boldsymbol{\sigma}^* \cdot \mathbf{p}}{E + m} \phi^*\\
-i\sigma_2 \phi^*
\end{bmatrix}
e^{ip\cdot x}$$
Note the stray complex conjugates. These can be consolidated with the identity
$$\sigma_2 \left(\boldsymbol\sigma^* \cdot \mathbf k\right) \sigma_2 = - \boldsymbol\sigma\cdot\mathbf k$$
to obtain
$$\psi^{(+)}_c
= \textstyle \sqrt{\frac{E + m}{2m}}
\begin{bmatrix}
\frac{\boldsymbol{\sigma} \cdot \mathbf{p}}{E + m} \chi \\
\chi
\end{bmatrix}
e^{ip\cdot x}$$
with the 2-spinor being
$$\chi = -i\sigma_2 \phi^*$$
As this has precisely the form of the negative energy solution, it becomes clear that charge conjugation exchanges the particle and anti-particle solutions. Note that not only is the energy reversed, but the momentum is reversed as well. Spin-up is transmuted to spin-down. It can be shown that the parity is also flipped. Charge conjugation is very much a pairing of Dirac spinor to its "exact opposite".

== Chiral basis ==
In the chiral (or Weyl) representation of $\gamma^\mu$, the solution space for the Dirac equation can be parameterized by two‐component complex spinors $\xi_s$ and $\eta_s$. The general Dirac spinor solutions in this representation are often written as

$$u_s(p) = \begin{pmatrix}\sqrt{p \cdot \sigma}\,\xi_s\\ \sqrt{p \cdot \bar\sigma}\,\xi_s\end{pmatrix}, \quad \quad v_s(p) = \begin{pmatrix}\sqrt{p \cdot \sigma}\,\eta_s\\ -\sqrt{p \cdot \bar\sigma}\,\eta_s\end{pmatrix},$$

where $\sigma^\mu = (I_2, \sigma^i),~ \bar\sigma^\mu = (I_2, -\sigma^i)$ are Pauli 4-vectors and $\sqrt{\cdot}$ denotes the Hermitian matrix square-root. In many practical calculations, it is convenient to choose $\mathbf{p}$ along the $z$ axis. With this choice, the contractions read as

$$p \cdot \sigma \equiv p_{\mu} \sigma^{\mu} =
\begin{pmatrix}
E - p_z & 0 \\
0 & E + p_z
\end{pmatrix}, \quad
p \cdot \bar \sigma \equiv p_{\mu} \bar\sigma^{\mu} =
\begin{pmatrix}
E + p_z & 0 \\
0 & E - p_z
\end{pmatrix}.$$

Since the matrices are diagonal, their square roots are

$$\sqrt{p_{\mu} \sigma^{\mu}} =
\begin{pmatrix}
\sqrt{E - p_z} & 0 \\
0 & \sqrt{E + p_z }
\end{pmatrix}, \quad
\sqrt{p_{\mu} \bar\sigma^{\mu}} =
\begin{pmatrix}
\sqrt{E + p_z} & 0 \\
0 & \sqrt{E - p_z}
\end{pmatrix}.$$

The most convenient choice for the two‐component spinors is:

$$\xi_{+\frac{1}{2}} = \begin{bmatrix} 1 \\ 0 \end{bmatrix} = \eta_{+\frac{1}{2}} \quad \quad
\xi_{-\frac{1}{2}} = \begin{bmatrix} 0 \\ 1 \end{bmatrix} = \eta_{-\frac{1}{2}}.$$

Then the four independent solutions take the explicit forms

$$u_{+\frac{1}{2}}(p_z) = \begin{pmatrix}\sqrt{E - p_z}\,\\ 0 \\ \sqrt{E+p_z}\,  \\ 0 \end{pmatrix}, \quad u_{-\frac{1}{2}}(p_z) = \begin{pmatrix}0\\ \sqrt{E+p_z}\,\\ 0 \\ \sqrt{E - p_z}\, \end{pmatrix},$$

$$v_{+\frac{1}{2}}(p_z) = \begin{pmatrix}\sqrt{E-p_z}\,\\ 0 \\ -\sqrt{E+p_z}\, \\ 0 \end{pmatrix}, \quad v_{-\frac{1}{2}}(p_z) = \begin{pmatrix}0\\ \sqrt{E+p_z}\, \\ 0 \\ -\sqrt{E-p_z}\, \end{pmatrix}.$$

The conventional normalization conditions for these spinors are

$$\begin{align}
\overline u_s (p) u_{s'} (p) &=  2m\delta_{ss'} & \overline u_s (p) v_{s'} (p) &=  0 \\
\overline v_s (p) v_{s'} (p) &=  -2m\delta_{ss'} & \overline v_s (p) u_{s'} (p) &=  0
\end{align}$$

while the completeness (spin‐sum) relations are

$$\begin{align}
\textstyle \sum_s \displaystyle u_s (p) \overline u_{s} (p) &= {p\!\!\!/} + m \\
\textstyle \sum_s \displaystyle v_s (p) \overline v_{s} (p) &= {p\!\!\!/} - m.
\end{align}$$

== See also ==
- Dirac equation
- Weyl equation
- Majorana equation
- Helicity basis
- Spin(1,3), the double cover of SO(1,3) by a spin group
