= Helicity basis =

In the Standard Model, using quantum field theory it is conventional to use the helicity basis to simplify calculations (of cross sections, for example). In this basis, the spin is quantized along the axis in the direction of motion of the particle.

== Spinors ==
The two-component helicity eigenstates $\xi_\lambda$ satisfy

$$\sigma \cdot \hat{p} \xi_\lambda\left(\hat{p}\right) = \lambda \xi_\lambda\left(\hat{p}\right) \,$$
where

$\sigma \,$ are the Pauli matrices,
$\hat{p} \,$ is the direction of the fermion momentum,
$\lambda = \pm 1 \,$ depending on whether spin is pointing in the same direction as $\hat{p} \,$ or opposite.

To say more about the state, $\xi_\lambda \,$ we will use the generic form of fermion four-momentum:

$$p^\mu = \left(E, \left|\vec{p}\right| \sin{\theta} \cos{\phi}, \left|\vec{p}\right| \sin{\theta} \sin{\phi}, \left|\vec{p}\right| \cos{\theta}  \right) \,$$

Then one can say the two helicity eigenstates are

$$\xi_{+1}(\vec{p}) =
\frac{1}{\sqrt{2 \left|\vec{p}\right|\left(\left|\vec{p}\right| + p_z\right)}}
\begin{pmatrix}
\left|\vec{p}\right| + p_z\\
p_x + i p_y
\end{pmatrix} = \begin{pmatrix}
\cos{\frac{\theta}{2}} \\
e^{i\phi}\sin{\frac{\theta}{2}}
\end{pmatrix}\,$$

and

$$\xi_{-1}(\vec{p}) =
\frac{1}{\sqrt{2 |\vec{p}|(|\vec{p}| + p_z)}}
\begin{pmatrix}
-p_x + i p_y \\
\left|\vec{p}\right| + p_z
\end{pmatrix} =
\begin{pmatrix}
-e^{-i\phi}\sin{\frac{\theta}{2}} \\
\cos{\frac{\theta}{2}}
\end{pmatrix}\,$$

These can be simplified by defining the z-axis such that the momentum direction is either parallel or anti-parallel, or rather:

$$\hat{z} = \pm \hat{p} \,$$.

In this situation the helicity eigenstates are for when the particle momentum is $\hat{p} = + \hat{z} \,$

$$\xi_{+1}(\hat{z}) = \begin{pmatrix}
1 \\
0
\end{pmatrix} \,$$
and
$$\xi_{-1}(\hat{z}) = \begin{pmatrix}
0 \\
1
\end{pmatrix} \,$$

then for when momentum is $\hat{p} = - \hat{z} \,$

$$\xi_{+1}(-\hat{z}) = \begin{pmatrix}
0 \\
1
\end{pmatrix} \,$$
and
$$\xi_{-1}(-\hat{z}) = \begin{pmatrix}
-1 \\
0
\end{pmatrix} \,$$

== Fermion (spin 1/2) wavefunction ==
A fermion 4-component wave function, $\psi\,$ may be decomposed into states with definite four-momentum:

$$\psi(x) = \int{\frac{d^3p}{(2\pi)^3 \sqrt{2E} } \sum_{\lambda \pm 1}{\left(\hat{a}_p^\lambda u_\lambda(p) e^{-i p \cdot x} + \hat{b}_p^\lambda v_\lambda(p) e^{i p \cdot x} \right)} } \,$$
where

$\hat{a}_p^\lambda \,$ and $\hat{b}_p^\lambda \,$ are the creation and annihilation operators, and
$u_\lambda(p) \,$ and $v_\lambda(p) \,$ are the momentum-space Dirac spinors for a fermion and anti-fermion respectively.

Put it more explicitly, the Dirac spinors in the helicity basis for a fermion is

$$u_\lambda(p) =  \begin{pmatrix}
u_{-1} \\
u_{+1}
\end{pmatrix} = \begin{pmatrix}
\sqrt{E - \lambda \left|\vec{p}\right|} \chi_\lambda(\hat{p}) \\
\sqrt{E + \lambda \left|\vec{p}\right|} \chi_\lambda(\hat{p})
\end{pmatrix} \,$$

and for an anti-fermion,

$$v_\lambda(p) = \begin{pmatrix}
v_{+1} \\
v_{-1}
\end{pmatrix} = \begin{pmatrix}
-\lambda \sqrt{E + \lambda \left|\vec{p}\right|} \chi_{-\lambda}(\hat{p}) \\
\lambda \sqrt{E - \lambda \left|\vec{p}\right|} \chi_{-\lambda}(\hat{p})
\end{pmatrix}$$

=== Dirac matrices ===
To use these helicity states, one can use the Weyl (chiral) representation for the Dirac matrices.

== Spin-1 wavefunctions ==
The plane wave expansion is

$$\psi(x) =
\int{\frac{d^3p}{(2\pi)^3 \sqrt{2E}} \sum_{\lambda = 0}^3 \left(
\hat{a}_{p,\lambda} \epsilon_\lambda(p) e^{-i p \cdot x} +
\hat{a}_{p,\lambda}^\dagger \epsilon^*_\lambda(p) e^{i p \cdot x}
\right)} \,$$.

For a vector boson with mass m and a four-momentum $q^\mu = (E, q_x, q_y, q_z)$, the polarization vectors quantized with respect to its momentum direction can be defined as

$$\begin{align}
\epsilon^\mu(q, x) &= \frac{1}{\left|\vec{q}\right| q_\text{T}} \left(0,q_x q_z, q_y q_z, -q_\text{T}^2 \right) \\
\epsilon^\mu(q ,y) &= \frac{1}{q_\text{T}} \left( 0, -q_y, q_x, 0 \right) \\
\epsilon^\mu(q, z) &= \frac{E}{m\left|\vec{q}\right|} \left(\frac{\left|\vec{q}\right|^2}{E}, q_x, q_y, q_z \right)
\end{align}$$
where

$q_\text{T} = \sqrt{q_x^2 + q_y^2} \,$ is transverse momentum, and
$E = \sqrt{|\vec{q}|^2 + m^2} \,$ is the energy of the boson.
