= Wilson fermion =

Lattice fermion discretisation

In lattice field theory, Wilson fermions are a fermion discretization that allows to avoid the fermion doubling problem proposed by Kenneth Wilson in 1974. They are widely used, for instance in lattice QCD calculations.

An additional so-called Wilson term

$$S_W=-a^{d+1}\sum_{x,\mu}\frac{i}{2a^2}\left(\bar\psi_x\psi_{x+\hat\mu}+\bar\psi_{x+\hat\mu}\psi_{x}-2\bar\psi_x\psi_x\right)$$

is introduced supplementing the naively discretized Dirac action in $d$-dimensional Euclidean spacetime with lattice spacing $a$, Dirac fields $\psi_x$ at every lattice point $x$, and the vectors $\hat \mu$ being unit vectors in the $\mu$ direction. The inverse free fermion propagator in momentum space now reads

$$D(p)=m + \frac ia\sum_\mu \gamma_\mu\sin\left(p_\mu a\right)+\frac1a\sum_\mu\left(1-\cos\left(p_\mu a\right)\right)\,$$

where the last addend corresponds to the Wilson term again. It modifies the mass $m$ of the doublers to

$$m+\frac{2l}{a}\,$$

where $l$ is the number of momentum components with $p_\mu=\pi/a$. In the continuum limit $a\rightarrow0$ the doublers become very heavy and decouple from the theory.

Wilson fermions do not contradict the Nielsen–Ninomiya theorem because they explicitly violate chiral symmetry since the Wilson term does not anti-commute with $\gamma_5$.
