= Paul Ginsparg =

American physicist

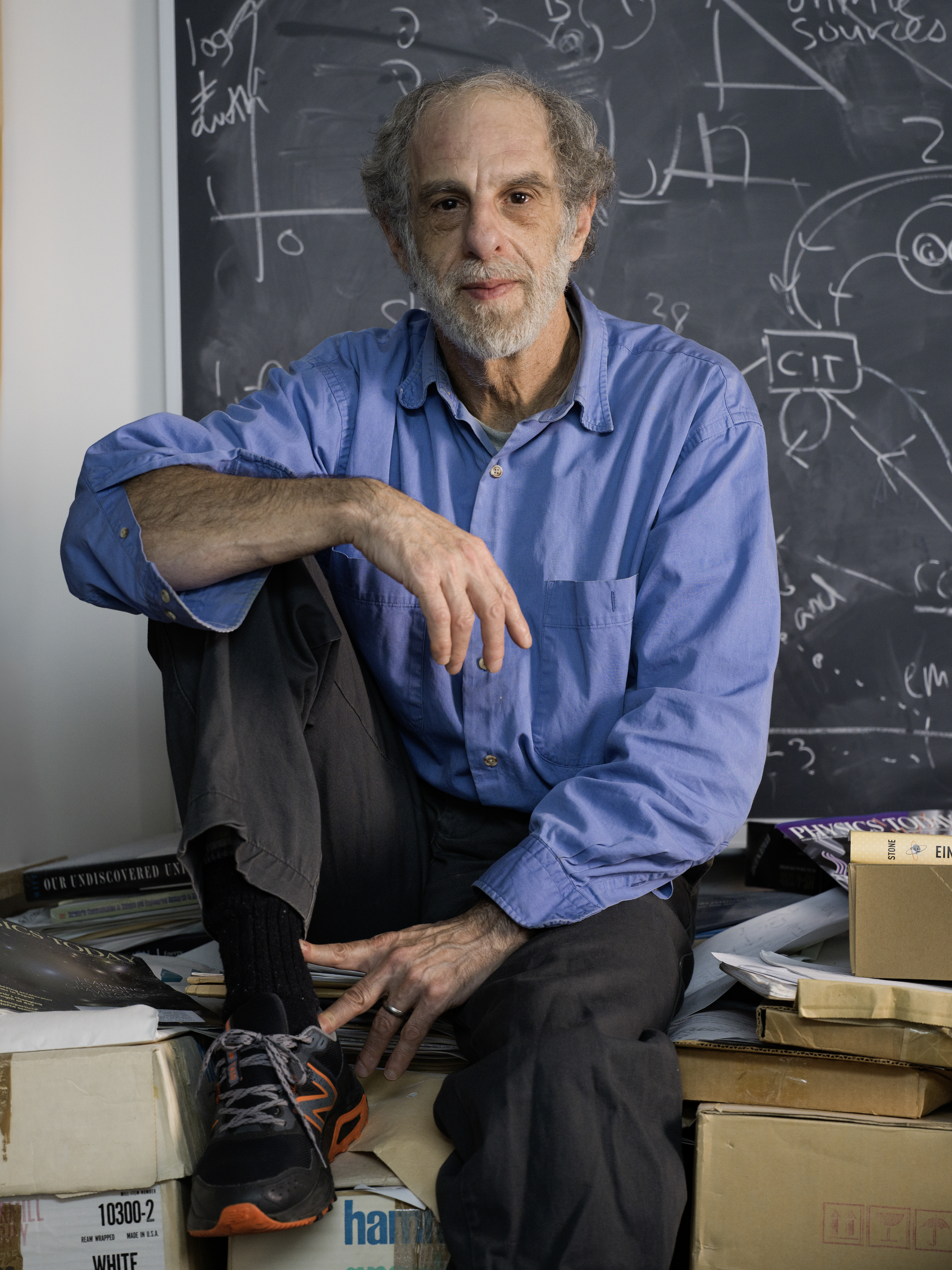
- Ginsparg in 2025
- Born: Paul Henry Ginsparg; Chicago, Illinois, U.S.
- Education: Harvard University (AB); Cornell University (PhD)
- Known for: ArXiv; Ginsparg–Wilson equation
- Awards: MacArthur Fellowship
- Scientific career
- Workplaces: Harvard University; Los Alamos National Laboratory; Cornell University
- Thesis: Aspects of symmetry behavior in quantum field theory (1981)
- Doctoral advisor: Kenneth G. Wilson
- Website: physics.cornell.edu/paul-ginsparg

Paul Henry Ginsparg is an American physicist. He developed the arXiv.org e-print archive.

== Education ==
He is a graduate of Syosset High School in Syosset, New York, on Long Island. He graduated from Harvard University with a Bachelor of Arts in physics and from Cornell University with a Doctor of Philosophy in theoretical particle physics with a thesis titled Aspects of symmetry behavior in quantum field theory.

== Career in physics ==
Ginsparg was a junior fellow and taught in the physics department at Harvard University until 1990. The pre-print archive was developed while he was a member of staff of Los Alamos National Laboratory, 1990–2001. Since 2001, Ginsparg has been a professor of Physics and Computing & Information Science at Cornell University.

He has published physics papers in the areas of quantum field theory, string theory, conformal field theory, and quantum gravity. He often comments on the changing world of physics in the Information Age.

== Awards ==
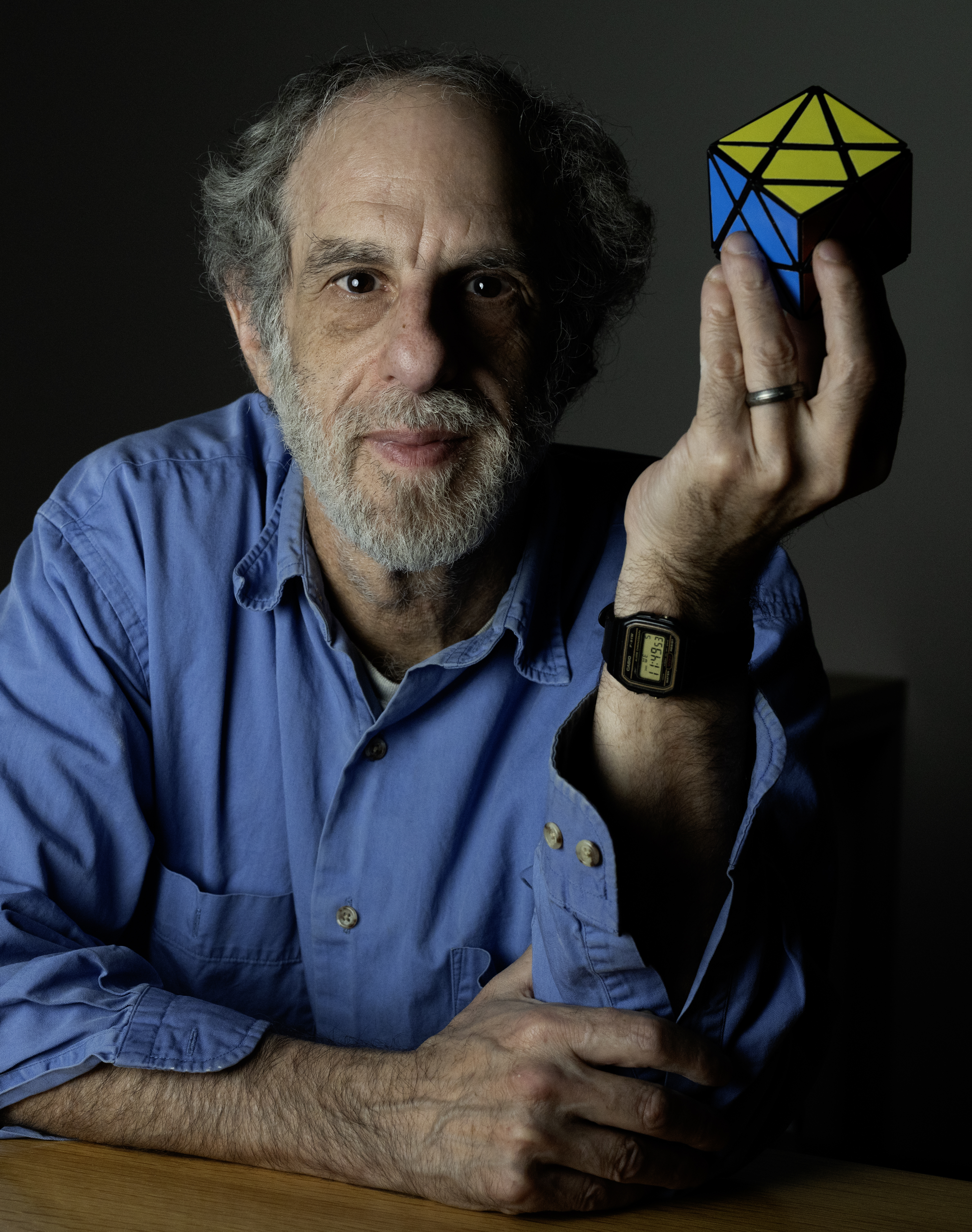
Ginsparg in 2025

He has been awarded the P.A.M. (Physics-Astronomy-Math) Award from the Special Libraries Association, named a Lingua Franca "Tech 20", elected as a Fellow of the American Physical Society, awarded a MacArthur Fellowship in 2002, received the Council of Science Editors Award for Meritorious Achievement, and received the Paul Evans Peters Award from Educause, ARL, and CNI. He was a Radcliffe Institute Fellow in 2008–2009. He was named a White House Champion of Change in June 2013. He was awarded with Einstein Foundation Award in 2021 for creating the arXiv.org.

== Personal life ==
He has two children - a daughter, Miryam Ginsparg (b. 2000), and a son, cellist Noam Ginsparg (b. 2004). His wife is Laura Jones, a mathematical biologist, statistician and researcher.

== Publications ==
- "Creating a global knowledge network", UNESCO Expert Conference on Electronic Publishing in Science, Paris, 19–23 February 2001, Second Joint ICSU Press
- Fluctuating geometries in statistical mechanics and field theory, Editors François David, Paul Ginsparg, Jean Zinn-Justin, Elsevier, 1996, ISBN 978-0-444-82294-9
- "First Steps toward Electronic Research Communication", Gateways to knowledge: the role of academic libraries in teaching, learning, and research, Editor Lawrence Dowler, MIT Press, 1997, ISBN 978-0-262-04159-1
- Ginsparg, P. (2006). "As We May Read". Journal of Neuroscience. 26 (38): 9606–9608. doi:10.1523/JNEUROSCI.3161-06.2006. PMC 6674456. PMID 16988030.
- Ginsparg, P.; Houle, P.; Joachims, T.; Sul, J. (2004). "Mapping subsets of scholarly information". Proceedings of the National Academy of Sciences. 101 (Suppl 1): 5236–5240. arXiv:cs/0312018. Bibcode:2004PNAS..101.5236G. doi:10.1073/pnas.0308253100. PMC 387301. PMID 14766973.
- Bachrach, S.; Berry, R.; Blume, M.; Von Foerster, T.; Fowler, A.; Ginsparg, P.; Heller, S.; Kestner, N.; Odlyzko, A.; Okerson, A.; Wigington, R.; Moffat, A. (1998). "Who should own scientific papers?". Science. 281 (5382): 1459–1460. Bibcode:1998Sci...281.1459B. doi:10.1126/science.281.5382.1459. PMID 9750115. S2CID 36290551.
- Freedman, D.; Ginsparg, P.; Sommerfield, C.; Warner, N. (1987). "String-ghost interactions and the trace anomaly". Physical Review D. 36 (6): 1800–1818. Bibcode:1987PhRvD..36.1800F. doi:10.1103/physrevd.36.1800. PMID 9958364.
- Ginsparg, P. (1987). "On toroidal compactification of heterotic superstrings". Physical Review D. 35 (2): 648–654. Bibcode:1987PhRvD..35..648G. doi:10.1103/physrevd.35.648. PMID 9957701.
