= John Kogut =

American physicist

- Born: March 6, 1945 (age 81); Brooklyn, United States
- Education: Stanford University
- Known for: Kogut–Susskind fermion Cornell potential Light front quantization
- Scientific career
- Fields: Particle physics
- Workplaces: Cornell University; University of Illinois Urbana-Champaign
- Thesis: Quantum electrodynamics at infinite momentum: applications to high energy scattering (1971)
- Doctoral advisor: James Bjorken
- Doctoral students: Matthias Staudacher

John Benjamin Kogut (6 March 1945) is an American theoretical physicist, specializing in high energy physics.

Kogut was born in Brooklyn in 1945.

Kogut received in 1971 his PhD from Stanford University under James Bjorken with thesis Quantum electrodynamics at infinite momentum: applications to high energy scattering. From 1971 to 1973 he was a visiting scholar at the Institute for Advanced Study and from 1971 to 1977 assistant professor of physics at Cornell University. For 27 years he was on the physics faculty of the Loomis Laboratory at the University of Illinois Urbana-Champaign, retiring in 2005 as professor emeritus. Since then, he has been a program manager at the United States Department of Energy, Office of Science (SC), Office of High Energy Physics.

Kogut is known for the Kogut–Susskind fermion and his collaboration with Leonard Susskind on the Hamiltonian formulation of Kenneth G. Wilson's lattice gauge theory. He also did research on the "infinite-momentum frame" (the subject of his PhD thesis) and the parton model.

Kogut played a leading role in opposing the Strategic Defense Initiative (aka "Star Wars") in the 1980s.

From 1976 to 1978 he was a Sloan Fellow. In 1982 he was elected a Fellow of the American Physical Society. For the academic year 1987–1988 he was a Guggenheim Fellow.

== Selected publications ==
=== Articles ===
- Introduction to lattice gauge theory and spin systems, Reviews of Modern Physics, vol. 51, 1979, pp. 659–713 doi:10.1103/RevModPhys.51.659
- with Kenneth G. Wilson: The Renormalization Group and the $\epsilon$-Expansion, Physics Reports, vol. 12, 1975, pp. 75–199 doi:10.1016/0370-1573(74)90023-4
- with Leonard Susskind: Everything you always wanted to know about partons, but were afraid to ask, Physics Reports vol. 8, 1973, p. 75

=== Books ===
- with Michail Stephanov: The phases of Quantum Chromodynamics, Cambridge University Press 2004
- Introduction to relativity, Academic Press 2001
