= Nielsen–Ninomiya theorem =

No-go theorem concerning chirality of regularized fermions

In lattice field theory, the Nielsen–Ninomiya theorem is a no-go theorem about placing chiral fermions on a lattice. In particular, under very general assumptions such as locality, hermiticity, and translational symmetry, any lattice formulation of chiral fermions necessarily leads to fermion doubling, where there are the same number of left-handed and right-handed fermions. It was first proved by Holger Bech Nielsen and Masao Ninomiya in 1981 using two methods, one that relied on homotopy theory and another that relied on differential topology. Another proof provided by Daniel Friedan uses differential geometry. The theorem was also generalized to any regularization scheme of chiral theories. One consequence of the theorem is that the Standard Model cannot be put on a lattice. Common methods for overcoming the fermion doubling problem is to use modified fermion formulations such as staggered fermions, Wilson fermions, or Ginsparg–Wilson fermions, among others.

== Lattice regularization ==
The theorem was originally formulated in the Hamiltonian formulation of lattice field theory where time is continuous but space has been discretized. Consider a theory with a Hamiltonian of the form

$$H = \sum_{\boldsymbol x, \boldsymbol y}\psi^\dagger(\boldsymbol x) F(\boldsymbol x, \boldsymbol y)\psi(\boldsymbol y)$$

together with a charge $Q$. The Nielsen–Ninomiya theorem states that there is an equal number of left-handed and right-handed fermions for every set of charges if the following assumptions are met

- Translational invariance: Implies that $F(\boldsymbol x,\boldsymbol y) = F(\boldsymbol x-\boldsymbol y)$.
- Locality: $F(\boldsymbol x-\boldsymbol y)$ must vanish fast enough to have a Fourier transform with continuous derivatives.
- Hermiticity: For the Hamiltonian to be Hermitian, $F(\boldsymbol x)$ must also be Hermitian.
- The charge is defined locally through some local charge density.
- The charge is quantized.
- The charge is exactly conserved.

This theorem trivially holds in odd dimensions since odd dimensional theories do not admit chiral fermions due to the absence of a valid chirality operator, that is an operator that anticommutes with all gamma matrices. This follows from the properties of Dirac algebras in odd dimensions.

The Nielsen–Ninomiya theorem has also been proven in the Euclidean formulation. For example, consider a weaker version of the theorem which assumes a less generic action of the form

$$S = \sum_{x,y,\mu} \bar \psi(x) i \gamma_\mu F_\mu(x,y)P_R \psi(y),$$

where $P_R$ is the right-handed projection operator, together with three assumptions

- Translational invariance: $F_\mu(x,y) = F_\mu(x-y)$.
- Hermiticity: For the action to be hermitian, it must hold that $F_\mu(-x) = F_\mu(x)^*$.
- Locality: The inverse propagator decreases fast enough so that its Fourier transform exists and all its derivatives are continuous.

If all these conditions are met then there is once again an equal number of left-handed and right-handed fermions.

=== Proof summary ===
The simplified Euclidean version of the theorem has a much shorter proof, relying on a key theorem from differential topology known as the Poincaré–Hopf theorem. It can be summarized as follows. From the locality assumption, the Fourier transform of the inverse propagator $F_\mu(k)$ must be a continuous vector field on the Brillouin zone whose isolated zeros correspond to different species of particles of the theory. Around each zero the vector field behavior is either a saddle singularity or a sink/source singularity. This is captured by the index of the vector field at the zero which takes the values $\pm 1$ for the two cases. It can be shown that the two cases determine whether the particle is left-handed or right-handed. The Poincaré–Hopf theorem states that the sum of the indices of a vector field on a manifold is equal the Euler characteristic of that manifold. In this case, the vector field lives on the Brillouin zone which is topologically a 4-torus which has Euler characteristic zero. Therefore, there must be an equal number of left-handed and right-handed particles.

== General regularization schemes ==
The Nielsen–Ninomiya theorem can be generalized to all possible regularization schemes, not just lattice regularization. This general no-go theorem states that no regularized chiral fermion theory can satisfy all the following conditions

- Invariance under at least the global part of the gauge group.
- Different number of left-handed and right-handed Weyl species for a given combination of generators.
- The correct chiral anomaly.
- An action bilinear in Weyl fields.

A short proof by contradiction points out that the Noether current acquired from some of the assumptions is conserved, while other assumptions imply that it is not.

Every regularization scheme must violate one or more of the conditions. For lattice regularization the Nielsen–Ninomiya theorem leads to the same result under even weaker assumptions where the requirement for the correct chiral anomaly is replaced by an assumption of locality of interactions. Dimensional regularization depends on the particular implementation of chirality. If the $\gamma_5$ matrix is defined as $\gamma_{[1}\gamma_2 \cdots \gamma_{4+\epsilon]}$ for infinitesimal $\epsilon$ then this leads to a vanishing chiral anomaly, while using $\gamma_{[1}\gamma_2 \gamma_3 \gamma_{4]}$ breaks global invariance. Meanwhile, Pauli–Villars regularization breaks global invariance since it introduces a regulator mass.

== See also ==
- Lattice gauge theory
