= Dirac algebra =

Clifford algebra in 4 dimensions

In mathematical physics, the Dirac algebra is the Clifford algebra $\text{Cl}_{1,3}(\mathbb{C})$. This was introduced by the mathematical physicist P. A. M. Dirac in 1928 in developing the Dirac equation for spin-1/2 particles with a matrix representation of the gamma matrices, which represent the generators of the algebra.

The gamma matrices are a set of four $4\times 4$ matrices $\{\gamma^\mu\} = \{\gamma^0,\gamma^1, \gamma^2, \gamma^3\}$ with entries in $\mathbb{C}$, that is, elements of $\text{Mat}_{4\times 4}(\mathbb{C})$ that satisfy

$$\displaystyle\{ \gamma^\mu, \gamma^\nu \} = \gamma^\mu \gamma^\nu + \gamma^\nu \gamma^\mu = 2 \eta^{\mu \nu},$$

where by convention, an identity matrix has been suppressed on the right-hand side. The numbers $\eta^{\mu \nu} \,$ are the components of the Minkowski metric. For this article we fix the signature to be mostly minus, that is, $(+,-,-,-)$.

The Dirac algebra is then the linear span of the identity, the gamma matrices $\gamma^\mu$ as well as any linearly independent products of the gamma matrices. This forms a finite-dimensional algebra over the field $\mathbb{R}$ or $\mathbb{C}$, with dimension $16 = 2^4$.

== Basis for the algebra ==
The algebra has a basis

$$I_4,$$
$$\gamma^\mu,$$
$$\gamma^\mu\gamma^\nu,$$
$$\gamma^\mu\gamma^\nu\gamma^\rho,$$
$$\gamma^\mu\gamma^\nu\gamma^\rho\gamma^\sigma = \gamma^0\gamma^1\gamma^2\gamma^3$$

where in each expression, each greek index is increasing as we move to the right. In particular, there is no repeated index in the expressions. By dimension counting, the dimension of the algebra is 16.

The algebra can be generated by taking products of the $\gamma^\mu$ alone: the identity arises as

$$I_4 = (\gamma^0)^2$$

while the others are explicitly products of the $\gamma^\mu$.

The basis elements are linearly independent

A general element of the algebra can be written

$$\Gamma = a + a_\mu\gamma^\mu + \frac{1}{2}a_{\mu\nu}\gamma^\mu\gamma^\nu + \frac{1}{3!}a_{\mu\nu\rho}\gamma^\mu\gamma^\rho\gamma^\sigma + \frac{1}{4!}a_{\mu\nu\rho\sigma}\gamma^\mu\gamma^\nu\gamma^\rho\gamma^\sigma,$$

with implicit summation. The components $a_{\mu_1\cdots \mu_n}$ are totally anti-symmetric. The numerical factors are chosen so that after ordering the basis elements in increasing order, the coefficient is 1.

The appropriate coefficient can be sampled by tracing $\Gamma$ against $\gamma^{\mu_1}\cdots\gamma^{\mu_n}$, up to a scalar factor, using identities involving traces of gamma matrices (see here, and the anti-symmetry of the $a_{\mu_1\cdots \mu_n}$).

These elements span the space generated by $\gamma^\mu$. We conclude that we really do have a basis of the Clifford algebra generated by the $\gamma^\mu.$

== Quadratic powers and Lorentz algebra ==
For the theory in this section, there are many choices of conventions found in the literature, often corresponding to factors of $\pm i$. For clarity, here we will choose conventions to minimise the number of numerical factors needed, but may lead to generators being anti-Hermitian rather than Hermitian.

There is another common way to write the quadratic subspace of the Clifford algebra:

$$S^{\mu\nu} = \frac{1}{4}[\gamma^\mu,\gamma^\nu]$$

with $\mu\neq\nu$. Note $S^{\mu\nu} = - S^{\nu\mu}$.

There is another way to write this which holds even when $\mu=\nu$:

$$S^{\mu\nu} = \frac{1}{2}(\gamma^\mu\gamma^\nu - \eta^{\mu\nu}).$$

This form can be used to show that the $S^{\mu\nu}$ form a representation of the Lorentz algebra (with real conventions)

$$[S^{\mu\nu}, S^{\rho\sigma}] = S^{\mu\sigma}\eta^{\nu\rho} - S^{\nu\sigma}\eta^{\mu\rho} + S^{\nu\rho}\eta^{\mu\sigma} - S^{\mu\rho}\eta^{\nu\sigma}.$$

=== Physics conventions ===
It is common convention in physics to include a factor of $\pm i$, so that Hermitian conjugation (where transposing is done with respect to the spacetime greek indices) gives a 'Hermitian matrix' of sigma generators

$\sigma^{\mu\nu} = -\frac{i}{4} \left[\gamma^\mu, \gamma^\nu\right],$	I4

only 6 of which are non-zero due to antisymmetry of the bracket, span the six-dimensional representation space of the tensor (1, 0) ⊕ (0, 1)-representation of the Lorentz algebra inside $\mathcal{Cl}_{1,3}(\R)$. Moreover, they have the commutation relations of the Lie algebra,

$i\left[\sigma^{\mu\nu}, \sigma^{\rho\tau}\right] = \eta^{\nu\rho}\sigma^{\mu\tau} - \eta^{\mu\rho}\sigma^{\nu\tau} - \eta^{\tau\mu}\sigma^{\rho\nu} + \eta^{\tau\nu}\sigma^{\rho\mu},$	I5

and hence constitute a representation of the Lorentz algebra (in addition to spanning a representation space) sitting inside $\mathcal{Cl}_{1,3}(\R),$ the $\left(\frac{1}{2},0\right)\oplus\left(0,\frac{1}{2}\right)$ spin representation.

=== Spin(1, 3) ===
The exponential map for matrices is well defined. The $S^{\mu\nu}$ satisfy the Lorentz algebra, and turn out to exponentiate to a representation of the spin group $\text{Spin}(1,3)$ of the Lorentz group $\text{SO}(1,3)$ (strictly, the future-directed part $\text{SO}(1,3)^+$ connected to the identity). The $S^{\mu\nu}$ are then the spin generators of this representation.

We emphasize that $S^{\mu\nu}$ is itself a matrix, not the components of a matrix. Its components as a $4\times 4$ complex matrix are labelled by convention using greek letters from the start of the alphabet $\alpha,\beta,\cdots$.

The action of $S^{\mu\nu}$ on a spinor $\psi$, which in this setting is an element of the vector space $\mathbb{C}^4$, is

$\psi\mapsto S^{\mu\nu}\psi$, or in components,
$$\psi^\alpha \mapsto (S^{\mu\nu})^\alpha{}_\beta\psi^\beta.$$

This corresponds to an infinitesimal Lorentz transformation on a spinor. Then a finite Lorentz transformation, parametrized by the components $\omega_{\mu\nu}$ (antisymmetric in $\mu,\nu$) can be expressed as

$$S := \exp\left(\frac{i}{2}\omega_{\mu\nu}S^{\mu\nu}\right).$$

From the property that

$$(\gamma^\mu)^\dagger = \gamma^0\gamma^\mu\gamma^0,$$

it follows that

$$(S^{\mu\nu})^\dagger = -\gamma^0 S^{\mu\nu}\gamma^0.$$

And $S$ as defined above satisfies

$$S^\dagger = \gamma^0 S^{-1} \gamma^0$$

This motivates the definition of Dirac adjoint for spinors $\psi$, of

$$\bar\psi:= \psi^\dagger \gamma^0$$.

The corresponding transformation for $S$ is

$$\bar S := \gamma^0 S^\dagger \gamma^0 = S^{-1}$$.

With this, it becomes simple to construct Lorentz invariant quantities for construction of Lagrangians such as the Dirac Lagrangian.

== Quartic power ==
The quartic subspace contains a single basis element,

$$\gamma^0\gamma^1\gamma^2\gamma^3 = \frac{1}{4!}\epsilon_{\mu\nu\rho\sigma}\gamma^\mu\gamma^\nu\gamma^\rho\gamma^\sigma,$$

where $\epsilon_{\mu\nu\rho\sigma}$ is the totally antisymmetric tensor such that $\epsilon_{0123} = +1$ by convention.

This is antisymmetric under exchange of any two adjacent gamma matrices.

=== γ^{5} ===
When considering the complex span, this basis element can alternatively be taken to be

$$\gamma^5 := i\gamma^0\gamma^1\gamma^2\gamma^3.$$

More details can be found here.

=== As a volume form ===
By total antisymmetry of the quartic element, it can be considered to be a volume form. In fact, this observation extends to a discussion of Clifford algebras as a generalization of the exterior algebra: both arise as quotients of the tensor algebra, but the exterior algebra gives a more restrictive quotient, where the anti-commutators all vanish.

== Derivation starting from the Dirac and Klein–Gordon equation ==
The defining form of the gamma elements can be derived if one assumes the covariant form of the Dirac equation:

$$-i \hbar \gamma^\mu \partial_\mu \psi + m c \psi = 0 \,.$$

and the Klein–Gordon equation:

$$- \partial_t^2 \psi + \nabla^2 \psi = m^2 \psi$$

to be given, and requires that these equations lead to consistent results.

Derivation from consistency requirement (proof). Multiplying the Dirac equation by its conjugate equation yields:

$$\psi^{\dagger}  ( i \hbar \gamma^\mu \partial_\mu + m c ) ( -i \hbar \gamma^\nu \partial_\nu + m c ) \psi = 0 \,.$$

The demand of consistency with the Klein–Gordon equation leads immediately to:

$$\displaystyle\{ \gamma^\mu, \gamma^\nu \} = \gamma^\mu \gamma^\nu + \gamma^\nu \gamma^\mu = 2 \eta^{\mu \nu} I_4$$

where $\{ , \}$ is the anticommutator, $\eta^{\mu \nu} \,$ is the Minkowski metric with signature (+ − − −) and $\ I_4 \,$ is the 4x4 unit matrix.

== Cl_{1,3}(C) and Cl_{1,3}(R) ==
The Dirac algebra can be regarded as a complexification of the real spacetime algebra Cl_{1,3}($\mathbb{R}$):

$$\mathrm{Cl}_{1,3}(\Complex) = \mathrm{Cl}_{1,3}(\R) \otimes \Complex.$$

Cl_{1,3}($\mathbb{R}$) differs from Cl_{1,3}($\mathbb{C}$): in Cl_{1,3}($\mathbb{R}$) only real linear combinations of the gamma matrices and their products are allowed.

Proponents of geometric algebra strive to work with real algebras wherever that is possible. They argue that it is generally possible (and usually enlightening) to identify the presence of an imaginary unit in a physical equation. Such units arise from one of the many quantities in a real Clifford algebra that square to −1, and these have geometric significance because of the properties of the algebra and the interaction of its various subspaces. Some of these proponents also question whether it is necessary or even useful to introduce an additional imaginary unit in the context of the Dirac equation.

In the mathematics of Riemannian geometry, it is conventional to define the Clifford algebra Cl_{p,q}($\mathbb{R}$) for arbitrary dimensions p,q; the anti-commutation of the Weyl spinors emerges naturally from the Clifford algebra. The Weyl spinors transform under the action of the spin group $\mathrm{Spin}(n)$. The complexification of the spin group, called the spinc group $\mathrm{Spin}^\mathbb{C}(n)$, is a product $\mathrm{Spin}(n)\times_{\mathbb{Z}_2} S^1$ of the spin group with the circle $S^1 \cong U(1)$ with the product $\times_{\mathbb{Z}_2}$ just a notational device to identify $(a,u)\in \mathrm{Spin}(n)\times S^1$ with $(-a, -u).$ The geometric point of this is that it disentangles the real spinor, which is covariant under Lorentz transformations, from the $U(1)$ component, which can be identified with the $U(1)$ fiber of the electromagnetic interaction. The $\times_{\mathbb{Z}_2}$ is entangling parity and charge conjugation in a manner suitable for relating the Dirac particle/anti-particle states (equivalently, the chiral states in the Weyl basis). The Dirac spinor, insofar as it has linearly independent left and right components, can interact with the electromagnetic field. This is in contrast to the Majorana spinor and the ELKO spinor, which cannot (i.e. they are electrically neutral), as they explicitly constrain the spinor so as to not interact with the $S^1$ part coming from the complexification. The ELKO spinor (Eigenspinoren des Ladungskonjugationsoperators) is a class 5 Lounesto spinor.

Insofar as the presentation of charge and parity can be a confusing topic in conventional quantum field theory textbooks, the more careful dissection of these topics in a general geometric setting can be elucidating. Standard expositions of the Clifford algebra construct the Weyl spinors from first principles; that they "automatically" anti-commute is an elegant geometric by-product of the construction, completely by-passing any arguments that appeal to the Pauli exclusion principle (or the sometimes common sensation that Grassmann variables have been introduced via ad hoc argumentation.)

In contemporary physics practice, the Dirac algebra continues to be the standard environment the spinors of the Dirac equation "live" in, rather than the spacetime algebra.

== See also ==
- Higher-dimensional gamma matrices
- Fierz identity
