= Lattice QCD =

Quantum chromodynamics on a lattice

Lattice QCD is a well-established non-perturbative approach to solving the quantum chromodynamics (QCD) theory of quarks and gluons. It is a lattice gauge theory formulated on a grid or lattice of points in space and time. When the size of the lattice is taken infinitely large and its sites infinitesimally close to each other, the continuum QCD is recovered. Lattice QCD was developed in the 1970s by Nobel laureate Kenneth Wilson. It was developed within a short interval of time after the theory of quantum chromodynamics had been discovered.

Analytic or perturbative solutions in low-energy QCD are hard or impossible to obtain due to the highly nonlinear nature of the strong force and the large coupling constant at low energies. The formulation of QCD in discrete rather than continuous spacetime naturally introduces a momentum cut-off at the order 1/a, where a is the lattice spacing, which regularizes the theory. As a result, lattice QCD is mathematically well-defined. Most importantly, lattice QCD provides a framework for investigation of non-perturbative phenomena such as confinement and quark–gluon plasma formation.

In lattice QCD, fields representing quarks are defined at lattice sites (which leads to fermion doubling), while the gluon fields are defined on the links connecting neighboring sites. This approximation approaches continuum QCD as the spacing between lattice sites is reduced to zero. Because the computational cost of numerical simulations increases as the lattice spacing decreases, results must be extrapolated to a = 0 (the continuum limit) by repeated calculations at different lattice spacings a.

Numerical lattice QCD calculations using Monte Carlo methods can be extremely computationally intensive, requiring the use of the largest available supercomputers. To reduce the computational burden, the so-called quenched approximation can be used, in which the quark fields are treated as non-dynamic "frozen" variables. While this was common in early lattice QCD calculations, "dynamical" fermions are now standard.

At present, lattice QCD is primarily applicable at low baryon densities where the numerical sign problem does not interfere with calculations. Monte Carlo methods are free from the sign problem when applied to the case of QCD with gauge group SU(2) (QC_{2}D), or two-color quantum chromodynamics.

Lattice QCD has already successfully agreed with many experiments. For example, the mass of the proton has been determined theoretically with an error of less than 2 percent. Lattice QCD predicts that the transition from confined quarks to quark–gluon plasma occurs around a temperature of 150 MeV (1.7×10^{12} K), within the range of experimental measurements.

Lattice QCD has also been used as a benchmark for high-performance computing, an approach originally developed in the context of the IBM Blue Gene supercomputer.

== Techniques ==
=== Monte-Carlo simulations ===
After Wick rotation, the path integral for the partition function of QCD takes the form

$$Z = \int \mathcal{D} U \, e^{-S[U]}
= \int \prod_{x, \mu} dU_\mu(x) \, e^{-S[U]}$$

where the gauge links $U_\mu(x) \in \mathrm{SU}(3)$ range over all the sites $x$ and space-time directions $\mu$ in a 4-dimensional space-time lattice, $S[U]$ denotes the (Euclidean) action and $dU_\mu(x)$ denotes the Haar measure on $\mathrm{SU}(3)$. Physical information is obtained by computing observables

$$\left\langle \mathcal{O} \right\rangle
= \frac{1}{Z} \int \mathcal{D} U \, \mathcal{O}(U)
e^{-S[U]}$$

For cases where evaluating observables pertubatively is difficult or impossible, a Monte Carlo approach can be used, computing an observable $\mathcal{O}$ as

$$\left\langle \mathcal{O} \right\rangle
\approx \frac{1}{N} \sum_{i=1}^{N} \mathcal{O}(U_i)$$

where $U_1, \dots, U_{N}$ are i.i.d random variables distributed according to the Boltzmann distribution $U_i \sim e^{-S[U_i]}/Z$. For practical calculations, the samples $\{U_i\}$ are typically obtained using Markov chain Monte Carlo methods, in particular Hybrid Monte Carlo, which was invented for this purpose.

=== Fermions on the lattice ===
Fermions in lattice QCD can be introduced formally by adding anticommuting Grassmann variables to the path integral, resulting in a partition function
$$Z = \int \mathcal{D} U \mathcal{D} \psi \mathcal{D} \bar{\psi} e^{-S_g[U] - S_f[U, \psi, \bar{\psi}]}$$
where $S_g[U]$ and $S_f[U]$ are referred to as the gauge action and fermion action, respectively. The fermion action is typically quadratic, taking the form $S_f[U] = \bar{\psi} D[U] \psi$, where $D[U]$ is referred to as the Dirac operator (see Dirac Equation). For quadratic actions, it is possible to perform the integral over the fermionic degrees of freedom explicitly, resulting in the partition function
$$Z = \int \mathcal{D} U e^{-S_g[U]} \det D(U)$$
where $\det D(U)$ is referred to as the fermion determinant.

The choice of fermion action is complicated by the fermion doubling problem as a consequence of the Nielsen-Ninomiya theorem. In practice the Nielsen-Ninomiya theorem is typically circumvented by violating one of its assumptions, often by breaking chiral symmetry; see fermion doubling for a list of fermions used in practice.

=== Continuum Limit ===
Numeric calculations typically operate on a lattice with finite lattice spacing $a$, however QCD is typically defined and understood as a continuum theory, and such a scale does not exist either theoretically or experimentally. Consequently, in order to obtain physical results a continuum limit $a \to 0$ is required. In practice this is accomplished by performing simulations at different lattice spacings, and then extrapolating to $a = 0$.

Taking a continuum limit in lattice QCD is complicated by the fact that the lattice spacing is not an input parameter; instead the action is determined in terms of the bare coupling $g$ and input fermion masses. In this context, the contiuum limit can be understood as a second order phase transition, with different choices of discretized action leading to universal behavior in the limit, provided that the theory is appropriately renormalized. For QCD, interpreting the bare coupling as a renormalized coupling $g(a)$ at the lattice spacing scale, as a consequence of asymptotic freedom the continuum limit is obtained for $g \to 0$.

=== Lattice perturbation theory ===
In lattice perturbation theory physical quantities (such as the scattering matrix) are expanded in powers of the lattice spacing, a. The results are used primarily to renormalize Lattice QCD Monte-Carlo calculations. In perturbative calculations both the operators of the action and the propagators are calculated on the lattice and expanded in powers of a. When renormalizing a calculation, the coefficients of the expansion need to be matched with a common continuum scheme, such as the MS-bar scheme, otherwise the results cannot be compared. The expansion has to be carried out to the same order in the continuum scheme and the lattice one.

The lattice regularization was initially introduced by Wilson as a framework for studying strongly coupled theories non-perturbatively. However, it was found to be a regularization suitable also for perturbative calculations. Perturbation theory involves an expansion in the coupling constant, and is well-justified in high-energy QCD where the coupling constant is small, while it fails completely when the coupling is large and higher order corrections are larger than lower orders in the perturbative series. In this region non-perturbative methods, such as Monte-Carlo sampling of the correlation function, are necessary.

Lattice perturbation theory can also provide results for condensed matter theory. One can use the lattice to represent the real atomic crystal. In this case the lattice spacing is a real physical value, and not an artifact of the calculation which has to be removed (a UV regulator), and a quantum field theory can be formulated and solved on the physical lattice.

=== Quantum computing ===
The U(1), SU(2), and SU(3) lattice gauge theories can be reformulated into a form that can be simulated using "spin qubit manipulations" on a universal quantum computer.

== Limitations ==
The method suffers from a few limitations:

- Currently there is no formulation of lattice QCD that allows us to simulate the real-time dynamics of a quark-gluon system such as quark–gluon plasma.
- It is computationally intensive, with the bottleneck not being flops but the bandwidth of memory access.
- Computations of observables at nonzero baryon density suffer from a sign problem, preventing direct computations of thermodynamic quantities.

== See also ==
- Lattice field theory
- Lattice gauge theory
- Lattice model (physics)
- Perturbative quantum chromodynamics
- QCD matter
- Quantum triviality
- SU(2) color superconductivity
- QCD sum rules
- Wilson action
