= Dirac spinor =

Mathematical description of fermions

In physics, and specifically in quantum field theory, a Dirac spinor is a mathematical construction that is used to describe some of the fundamental particles of nature, including quarks and electrons. It is a specific embodiment of a spinor, specifically constructed so that it is consistent with the requirements of special relativity. Dirac spinors transform in a certain "spinorial" fashion under the action of the Lorentz group, which describes the symmetries of Minkowski spacetime. They occur in the relativistic spin-1/2 wave function solutions to the Dirac equation.

They are constructed out of two simpler component spinors, the Weyl spinors. Each of the two component spinors transform differently under the two distinct complex-conjugate spin-1/2 representations of the Lorentz group. This pairing is of fundamental importance, as it allows the represented particle to have a mass, carry a charge, and represent the flow of charge as a current, and perhaps most importantly, to carry angular momentum. More precisely, the mass is a Casimir invariant of the Lorentz group (an eigenstate of the energy), while the vector combination carries momentum and current, being covariant under the action of the Lorentz group. The angular momentum is carried by the Poynting vector, suitably constructed for the spin field.

The convention used here is that the article on plane-wave solutions to the Dirac equation using the Dirac convention for the gamma matrices. By contrast, the article below concentrates primarily on the Weyl, or chiral representation, is less focused on the Dirac equation, and more focused on the geometric structure, including the geometry of the Lorentz group. Thus, much of what is said below can be applied to the Majorana equation.

== Definition ==
Dirac spinors are elements of a 4-dimensional complex vector space (1/2, 0) ⊕ (0, 1/2) representation of the Lorentz group.

In the Weyl basis, a Dirac spinor

$$\psi = \left(\begin{array}{c}\psi_{\rm L}\\ \psi_{\rm R}\end{array}\right)$$

consists of two (two-component) Weyl spinors $\psi_{\rm L}$ and $\psi_{\rm R}$ which transform, correspondingly, under (1/2, 0) and (0, 1/2) representations of the $\mathrm{SO}(1,3)$ group (the Lorentz group without parity transformations). Under parity transformation the Weyl spinors transform into each other.

The Dirac spinor is connected with the Weyl spinor by a unitary transformation to the Dirac basis,

$$\psi \rightarrow {1 \over\sqrt{2}}\left[\begin{array}{cc}
1 & 1 \\
-1 & 1
\end{array}\right]\psi =
{1 \over \sqrt{2}}\left(\begin{array}{c}
\psi_{\rm R} + \psi_{\rm L} \\
\psi_{\rm R} - \psi_{\rm L}
\end{array}\right) .$$

The Dirac basis is the one most widely used in the literature.

== Lorentz transformations ==
A Dirac spinor field $\psi(x)$ transforms according to the rule

$$\psi^a(x) \to {\psi^\prime}^a\left(x^\prime\right) = S[\Lambda]^a_b \psi^b\left(\Lambda^{-1}x^\prime\right) = S[\Lambda]^a_b \psi^b(x)$$

where $\Lambda$ is a Lorentz transformation. Here the coordinates of physical points are transformed according to $x^\prime = \Lambda x$, while $S$, a matrix, is an element of the spinor representation (for spin 1/2) of the Lorentz group.

In the Weyl basis, explicit transformation matrices for a boost $\Lambda_{\rm boost}$ and for a rotation $\Lambda_{\rm rot}$ are the following:

$$\begin{align}
S[\Lambda_{\rm boost}] &= (e^{+\chi\cdot\alpha / 2}) \\
S[\Lambda_{\rm rot}] &= \left(\begin{array}{cc}
e^{+i\phi\cdot\sigma / 2} & 0 \\
0 & e^{+i\phi\cdot\sigma / 2}
\end{array}\right)
\end{align}$$

Here $\chi$ is the boost parameter which is the rapidity multiplied by the normalized direction of the velocity, and $\phi^i$ represents rotation around the $x^i$ axis, $\sigma_i$ are the Pauli matrices and $\alpha$ is the vector made of gamma matrices $\alpha=\gamma_t(\gamma_x, \gamma_y, \gamma_z )$. The exponential is the exponential map, in this case the matrix exponential defined by putting the matrix into the usual power series for the exponential function.

== Properties ==
A bilinear form of Dirac spinors can be reduced to five irreducible (under the Lorentz group) objects:

1. scalar, $\bar{\psi}\psi$;
2. pseudo-scalar, $\bar{\psi}\gamma^5\psi$;
3. vector, $\bar{\psi}\gamma^\mu\psi$;
4. pseudo-vector, $\bar{\psi}\gamma^\mu\gamma^5\psi$;
5. antisymmetric tensor, $\bar{\psi}\left(\gamma^\mu\gamma^\nu - \gamma^\nu\gamma^\mu\right)\psi$,

where $\bar{\psi} \equiv \psi^\dagger\gamma^0$ and $\left\{\gamma^\mu, \gamma^5\right\}$ are the gamma matrices. These five quantities are inter-related by the Fierz identities. Their values are used in the Lounesto spinor field classification of the different types of spinors, of which the Dirac spinor is just one; the others being the flagpole (of which the Majorana spinor is a special case), the flag-dipole, and the Weyl spinor. The flagpole, flag-dipole and Weyl spinors all have null mass and pseudoscalar fields; the flagpole additionally has a null pseudovector field, whereas the Weyl spinors have a null antisymmetric tensor (a null "angular momentum field").

A suitable Lagrangian for the relativistic spin-1/2 field can be built out of these, and is given as

$$\mathcal{L} = {i \over 2}\left(\bar{\psi}\gamma^\mu\partial_\mu\psi - \partial_\mu\bar{\psi}\gamma^\mu\psi\right) - m\bar{\psi}\psi\;.$$

The Dirac equation can be derived from this Lagrangian by using the Euler–Lagrange equation.

== Derivation of a Dirac spinor representation ==
This outline describes one type of Dirac spinors as elements of a particular representation space of the (1/2, 0) ⊕ (0, 1/2) representation of the Lorentz group. This representation space is related to, but not identical to, the (1/2, 0) ⊕ (0, 1/2) representation space contained in the Clifford algebra over Minkowski spacetime as described in the article Spinors. Language and terminology is used as in Representation theory of the Lorentz group. The only property of Clifford algebras that is essential for the presentation is the defining property given in D1 below. The basis elements of so(3,1) are labeled M^{μν}.

A representation of the Lie algebra so(3,1) of the Lorentz group O(3,1) will emerge among matrices that will be chosen as a basis (as a vector space) of the complex Clifford algebra over spacetime. These 4×4 matrices are then exponentiated yielding a representation of SO(3,1)^{+}. This representation, that turns out to be a (1/2, 0) ⊕ (0, 1/2) representation, will act on an arbitrary 4-dimensional complex vector space, which will simply be taken as C^{4}, and its elements will be Dirac spinors.

For reference, the commutation relations of so(3,1) are

$\left[M^{\mu\nu}, M^{\rho\sigma}\right] = i\left(\eta^{\sigma\mu}M^{\rho\nu} + \eta^{\nu\sigma}M^{\mu\rho} - \eta^{\rho\mu}M^{\sigma\nu} - \eta^{\nu\rho}M^{\mu\sigma}\right)$	M1

with the spacetime metric η = diag(−1, 1, 1, 1).

=== Gamma matrices ===
Let γ^{μ} denote a set of four 4-dimensional gamma matrices, here called the Dirac matrices. The Dirac matrices satisfy

$\left\{\gamma^\mu, \gamma^\nu\right\} = 2\eta^{\mu\nu}I_4,$	D1

where { , } is the anticommutator, I_{4} is a 4×4 unit matrix, and η^{μν} is the spacetime metric with signature (+,−,−,−). This is the defining condition for a generating set of a Clifford algebra. Further basis elements σ^{μν} of the Clifford algebra are given by

$\sigma^{\mu\nu} = -\frac{i}{4}\left[\gamma^{\mu}\gamma^{\nu} - \gamma^{\nu}\gamma^{\mu}\right].$	C1

Only six of the matrices σ^{μν} are linearly independent. This follows directly from their definition since σ^{μν} = −σ^{νμ}. They act on the subspace V_{γ} the γ^{μ} span in the passive sense, according to

$\left[\sigma^{\mu\nu}, \gamma^{\rho}\right] = -i\gamma^{\mu}\eta^{\nu\rho} + i\gamma^{\nu}\eta^{\mu\rho}.$	C2

In (C2), the second equality follows from property (D1) of the Clifford algebra.

=== Lie algebra embedding of so(3,1) in Cl_{4}(C) ===
Now define an action of so(3,1) on the σ^{μν}, and the linear subspace V_{σ} ⊂ Cl_{4}(C) they span in Cl_{4}(C) ≈ M^{n}_{C}, given by

$\pi\left(M^{\mu\nu}\right)\left(\sigma^{\rho\sigma}\right) = \left[\sigma^{\mu\nu}, \sigma^{\rho\sigma}\right] = i\left(\eta^{\sigma\mu}\sigma^{\rho\nu} + \eta^{\sigma\nu}\sigma^{\rho\mu} - \eta^{\mu\rho}\sigma^{\nu\sigma} - \eta^{\nu\rho}\sigma^{\mu\sigma}\right).$	C4

The last equality in (C4), which follows from (C2) and the property (D1) of the gamma matrices, shows that the σ^{μν} constitute a representation of so(3,1) since the commutation relations in (C4) are exactly those of so(3,1). The action of π(M^{μν}) can either be thought of as six-dimensional matrices Σ^{μν} multiplying the basis vectors σ^{μν}, since the space in M_{n}(C) spanned by the σ^{μν} is six-dimensional, or be thought of as the action by commutation on the σ^{ρσ}. In the following, π(M^{μν}) = σ^{μν}

The γ^{μ} and the σ^{μν} are both (disjoint) subsets of the basis elements of Cl_{4}(C), generated by the four-dimensional Dirac matrices γ^{μ} in four spacetime dimensions. The Lie algebra of so(3,1) is thus embedded in Cl_{4}(C) by π as the real subspace of Cl_{4}(C) spanned by the σ^{μν}. For a full description of the remaining basis elements other than γ^{μ} and σ^{μν} of the Clifford algebra, please see the article Dirac algebra.

=== Dirac spinors introduced ===
Now introduce any 4-dimensional complex vector space U where the γ^{μ} act by matrix multiplication. Here U = C^{4} will do nicely. Let Λ = e^{ω_{μν}M^{μν}} be a Lorentz transformation and define the action of the Lorentz group on U to be

$$u \rightarrow S(\Lambda)u = e^{i\pi(\omega_{\mu\nu}M^{\mu\nu})}u;\quad u^\alpha \rightarrow [e^{\omega_{\mu\nu}\sigma^{{\mu\nu}}}]^\alpha{}_\beta u^\beta.$$

Since the σ^{μν} according to (C4) constitute a representation of so(3,1), the induced map

$S:\mathrm{SO}(3,1)^+ \rightarrow \mathrm{GL}(U);\quad \Lambda \rightarrow e^{i\pi(X)};\quad e^{iX} = \Lambda, \quad X = \omega_{\mu\nu}M^{\mu\nu}\in \mathfrak{so}(3,1)$	C5

according to general theory either is a representation or a projective representation of SO(3,1)^{+}. It will turn out to be a projective representation. The elements of U, when endowed with the transformation rule given by S, are called Dirac spinors or simply spinors.

=== Choosing Dirac matrices ===
It remains to choose a set of Dirac matrices γ^{μ} in order to obtain the spin representation S. One such choice, appropriate for the ultrarelativistic limit, is

$$\begin{align} \gamma^{0} &= -i\biggl(\begin{matrix} 0 & I\\ I & 0\\ \end{matrix}\biggr),\\ \gamma^{i} &= -i\biggl(\begin{matrix} 0 & \sigma_i\\ -\sigma_i & 0\\ \end{matrix}\biggr), \quad i = 1,2,3\\ \end{align}.$$	E1

where the σ_{i} are the Pauli matrices. In this representation of the Clifford algebra generators, the σ^{μν} become

$$\begin{align} \sigma^{i0} &= \frac{i}{2}\biggl(\begin{matrix} \sigma_i & 0 \\ 0 & -\sigma_i \\ \end{matrix}\biggr),\\ \sigma^{ij} &= \frac{1}{2}\epsilon_{ijk} \biggl(\begin{matrix} \sigma_k & 0 \\ 0 & \sigma_k \\ \end{matrix}\biggr)\\ \end{align}.$$	E23

This representation is manifestly not irreducible, since the matrices are all block diagonal. But by irreducibility of the Pauli matrices, the representation cannot be further reduced. Since it is a 4-dimensional, the only possibility is that it is a (1/2,0)⊕(0,1/2) representation, i.e. a Dirac spinor representation. Now using the recipe of exponentiation of the Lie algebra representation to obtain a representation of SO(3,1)^{+},

$$\begin{align} S\left(\Lambda_{B}\right) &= e^{i\pi(\chi \cdot \mathbf{K})} = \biggl(\begin{matrix} e^{-\frac{1}{2}\chi\cdot\sigma} & 0 \\ 0 & e^{\frac{1}{2}\chi\cdot\sigma} \\ \end{matrix}\biggr),\\ S\left(\Lambda_{R}\right) &= e^{i\pi(\phi \cdot \mathbf{J})} = \biggl(\begin{matrix} e^{\frac{i}{2}\phi\cdot\sigma} & 0 \\ 0 & e^{\frac{i}{2}\phi\cdot\sigma} \\ \end{matrix}\biggr)\\ \end{align},$$	E3

a projective 2-valued representation is obtained. Here φ is a vector of rotation parameters with 0 ≤ φ^{i} ≤ 2π, and χ is a vector of boost parameters. With the conventions used here one may write

$$\psi = \begin{pmatrix} \psi_{\mathrm R} \\ \psi_{\mathrm L} \end{pmatrix},$$	E4

for a Dirac spinor field. Here, the upper component corresponds to a right Weyl spinor. To include space parity inversion in this formalism, one sets

$$\beta = i\gamma^0 = \biggl(\begin{matrix} 0 & I\\ I & 0\\ \end{matrix}\biggr),$$	E5

as representative for P = diag(1, −1, −1, −1). It is seen that the representation is irreducible when space parity inversion is included.

=== Example ===
Let X = 2πM^{12} so that X generates a rotation around the z-axis by an angle of 2π. Then Λ = e^{iX} = I ∈ SO(3,1)^{+} but e^{iπ(X)} = −I ∈ GL(U). Here, I denotes the identity element. If X = 0 is chosen instead, then still Λ = e^{iX} = I ∈ SO(3,1)^{+}, but now e^{iπ(X)} = I ∈ GL(U).

This illustrates the double-valued nature of a spin representation. The identity in SO(3,1)^{+} gets mapped into either −I ∈ GL(U) or I ∈ GL(U) depending on the choice of Lie algebra element to represent it. In the first case, one can speculate that a rotation of an angle 2π negates a Dirac spinor, and that it requires a 4π rotation to rotate a Diracspinor back into itself. What really happens is that the identity in SO(3,1)^{+} is mapped to −I in GL(U) with an unfortunate choice of X.

It is impossible to continuously choose X for all g ∈ SO(3,1)^{+} so that S is a continuous representation. Suppose that one defines S along a loop in SO(3,1) such that X(t) = 2πtM^{12}, 0 ≤ t ≤ 1. This is a closed loop in SO(3,1), i.e. rotations ranging from 0 to 2π around the z-axis under the exponential mapping, but it is only "half" a loop in GL(U), ending at −I. In addition, the value of I ∈ SO(3,1) is ambiguous, since t = 0 and t = 2π gives different values for I ∈ SO(3,1).

=== Dirac algebra ===
The representation S on Dirac spinors will induce a representation of SO(3,1)^{+} on End(U), the set of linear operators on U. This space corresponds to the Clifford algebra itself so that all linear operators on U are elements of the latter. This representation, and how it decomposes as a direct sum of irreducible SO(3,1)^{+} representations, is described in the article on Dirac algebra. One of the consequences is the decomposition of the bilinear forms on U × U. This decomposition hints how to couple any Dirac spinor field with other fields in a Lagrangian to yield Lorentz scalars.

== Dirac algebra ==
The Dirac matrices are a set of four 4×4 matrices forming the Dirac algebra, and are used to intertwine the spin direction with the local reference frame (the local coordinate frame of spacetime), as well as to define charge (C-symmetry), parity and time reversal operators.

=== Conventions ===
There are several choices of signature and representation that are in common use in the physics literature. The Dirac matrices are typically written as $\gamma^\mu$ where $\mu$ runs from 0 to 3. In this notation, 0 corresponds to time, and 1 through 3 correspond to x, y, and z.

The + − − − signature is sometimes called the west coast metric, while the − + + + is the east coast metric. At this time the + − − − signature is in more common use, and our example will use this signature. To switch from one example to the other, multiply all $\gamma^\mu$ by $i$.

After choosing the signature, there are many ways of constructing a representation in the 4×4 matrices, and many are in common use. In order to make this example as general as possible we will not specify a representation until the final step. At that time we will substitute in the "chiral" or Weyl representation.

=== Construction with a given spin direction and charge ===
First we choose a spin direction for our electron or positron. As with the example of the Pauli algebra discussed above, the spin direction is defined by a unit vector in 3 dimensions, (a, b, c). Following the convention of Peskin & Schroeder, the spin operator for spin in the (a, b, c) direction is defined as the dot product of (a, b, c) with the vector

$$\begin{align}
\left(i\gamma^2\gamma^3,\;\;i\gamma^3\gamma^1,\;\;i\gamma^1\gamma^2\right)
&= -\left(\gamma^1,\;\gamma^2,\;\gamma^3\right)i\gamma^1\gamma^2\gamma^3 \\
\sigma_{(a,b,c)} &= ia\gamma^2\gamma^3 + ib\gamma^3\gamma^1 + ic\gamma^1\gamma^2
\end{align}$$

Note that the above is a root of unity, that is, it squares to 1. Consequently, we can make a projection operator from it that projects out the sub-algebra of the Dirac algebra that has spin oriented in the (a, b, c) direction:

$$P_{(a,b,c)} = \frac{1}{2}\left(1 + \sigma_{(a,b,c)}\right)$$

Now we must choose a charge, +1 (positron) or −1 (electron). Following the conventions of Peskin & Schroeder, the operator for charge is $Q = -\gamma^0$, that is, electron states will take an eigenvalue of −1 with respect to this operator while positron states will take an eigenvalue of +1.

Note that $Q$ is also a square root of unity. Furthermore, $Q$ commutes with $\sigma_{(a, b, c)}$. They form a complete set of commuting operators for the Dirac algebra. Continuing with our example, we look for a representation of an electron with spin in the (a, b, c) direction. Turning $Q$ into a projection operator for charge = −1, we have

$$P_{-Q} = \frac{1}{2}\left(1 - Q\right) = \frac{1}{2}\left(1 + \gamma^0\right)$$

The projection operator for the spinor we seek is therefore the product of the two projection operators we've found:

$$P_{(a, b, c)}\;P_{-Q}$$

The above projection operator, when applied to any spinor, will give that part of the spinor that corresponds to the electron state we seek. So we can apply it to a spinor with the value 1 in one of its components, and 0 in the others, which gives a column of the matrix. Continuing the example, we put (a, b, c) = (0, 0, 1) and have

$$P_{(0, 0, 1)} = \frac{1}{2}\left(1 + i\gamma_1\gamma_2\right)$$

and so our desired projection operator is

$$P = \frac{1}{2}\left(1+ i\gamma^1\gamma^2\right) \cdot \frac{1}{2}\left(1 + \gamma^0\right) =
\frac{1}{4}\left(1 + \gamma^0 + i\gamma^1\gamma^2 + i\gamma^0\gamma^1\gamma^2\right)$$

The 4×4 gamma matrices used in the Weyl representation are

$$\begin{align}
\gamma_0 &= \begin{bmatrix}0 & 1 \\ 1 & 0\end{bmatrix} \\
\gamma_k &= \begin{bmatrix}0 & \sigma^k \\ -\sigma^k & 0\end{bmatrix}
\end{align}$$

for k = 1, 2, 3 and where $\sigma^i$ are the usual 2×2 Pauli matrices. Substituting these in for P gives

$$P =
\frac{1}{4}\begin{bmatrix}1 + \sigma^3 & 1 + \sigma^3 \\ 1 + \sigma^3 & 1 + \sigma^3 \end{bmatrix} =
\frac{1}{2}\begin{bmatrix}1 & 0 & 1 & 0 \\ 0 & 0 & 0 & 0 \\ 1 & 0 & 1 & 0 \\ 0 & 0 & 0 & 0\end{bmatrix}$$

Our answer is any non-zero column of the above matrix. The division by two is just a normalization. The first and third columns give the same result:

$$\left|e^-,\, +\frac{1}{2}\right\rangle = \begin{bmatrix} 1 \\ 0 \\ 1 \\ 0 \end{bmatrix}$$

More generally, for electrons and positrons with spin oriented in the (a, b, c) direction, the projection operator is

$$\frac{1}{4}\begin{bmatrix}
1 +  c  &     a - ib  & \pm(1 +  c) & \pm(a - ib) \\
a + ib  &     1 -  c  & \pm(a + ib) & \pm(1 -  c) \\
\pm(1 +  c) & \pm(a - ib) &     1 +  c  &     a - ib  \\
\pm(a + ib) & \pm(1 -  c) &     a + ib  &     1 -  c
\end{bmatrix}$$

where the upper signs are for the electron and the lower signs are for the positron. The corresponding spinor can be taken as any non zero column. Since $a^2 + b^2 + c^2 = 1$ the different columns are multiples of the same spinor. The representation of the resulting spinor in the Dirac basis can be obtained using the rule given in the Dirac spinor article.

== See also ==
- Spin(3,1), the double cover of SO(3,1) by a spin group
- Rarita–Schwinger equation
