= Continuum limit =

Continuum limit in lattice models

An animated example of a Brownian motion-like random walk on a torus. In the scaling limit, random walk approaches the Wiener process according to Donsker's theorem.

In mathematical physics and mathematics, the continuum limit or scaling limit of a lattice model characterizes its behaviour in the limit as the lattice spacing goes to zero. It is often useful to use lattice models to approximate real-world processes, such as Brownian motion. Indeed, according to Donsker's theorem, the discrete random walk would, in the scaling limit, approach the true Brownian motion.

== Terminology ==
The term continuum limit mostly finds use in the physical sciences, often in reference to models of aspects of quantum physics, while the term scaling limit is more common in mathematical use.

== Application in quantum field theory ==
A lattice model that approximates a continuum quantum field theory in the limit as the lattice spacing goes to zero may correspond to finding a second order phase transition of the model. This is the scaling limit of the model.

== See also ==
- Universality class
