= Lattice field theory =

Quantum field theory on a lattice

In lattice field theory, space or spacetime is discretised onto a lattice.

In physics, lattice field theory is the study of lattice models of quantum field theory. Unlike in continuum quantum field theory, lattice field theory is the study of models of quantum fields in the setting of discretized space or spacetime. Rather than a field present at any point in space (or spacetime), as is allowed in the continuum case, on the lattice fields can only exist at each lattice point, or on the edges between them.

Lattice models of field theory were introduced in the 1970s by Wilson, Kogut and Susskind, and others. Since then, they have served as an important framework for calculations that are difficult or impossible without it.

== Details ==
Although most lattice field theories are not exactly solvable, they are immensely appealing due to their feasibility for computer simulation, often using Markov chain Monte Carlo methods. One hopes that, by performing simulations on larger and larger lattices, while making the lattice spacing smaller and smaller, one will be able to recover the behavior of the continuum theory as the continuum limit is approached.

Just as in all lattice models, numerical simulation provides access to field configurations that are not accessible to perturbation theory, such as solitons. Similarly, non-trivial vacuum states can be identified and examined.

The method is particularly appealing for the quantization of a gauge theory using the Wilson action. Most quantization approaches maintain Poincaré invariance manifest but sacrifice manifest gauge symmetry by requiring gauge fixing. It's only after renormalization that gauge invariance can be recovered. Lattice field theory differs from these in that it keeps manifest gauge invariance, but sacrifices manifest Poincaré invariance—recovering it only after renormalization. The articles on lattice gauge theory and lattice QCD explore these issues in greater detail.

== See also ==
- Fermion doubling
