= Majorana equation =

Relativistic wave description of fermions

In physics, the Majorana equation is a relativistic wave equation. It is named after the Italian physicist Ettore Majorana, who proposed it in 1937 as a means of describing fermions that are their own antiparticle. Particles corresponding to this equation are termed Majorana particles, although that term now has a more expansive meaning, referring to any (possibly non-relativistic) fermionic particle that is its own anti-particle (and is therefore electrically neutral).

There have been proposals that massive neutrinos are described by Majorana particles; there are various extensions to the Standard Model that enable this. The article on Majorana particles presents status for the experimental searches, including details about neutrinos. This article focuses primarily on the mathematical development of the theory, with attention to its discrete and continuous symmetries. The discrete symmetries are charge conjugation, parity transformation and time reversal; the continuous symmetry is Lorentz invariance.

Charge conjugation plays an outsize role, as it is the key symmetry that allows the Majorana particles to be described as electrically neutral. A particularly remarkable aspect is that electrical neutrality allows several global phases to be freely chosen, one each for the left and right chiral fields. This implies that, without explicit constraints on these phases, the Majorana fields are naturally CP violating. Another aspect of electric neutrality is that the left and right chiral fields can be given distinct masses. That is, electric charge is a Lorentz invariant, and also a constant of motion; whereas chirality is a Lorentz invariant, but is not a constant of motion for massive fields. Electrically neutral fields are thus less constrained than charged fields. Under charge conjugation, the two free global phases appear in the mass terms (as they are Lorentz invariant), and so the Majorana mass is described by a complex matrix, rather than a single number. In short, the discrete symmetries of the Majorana equation are considerably more complicated than those for the Dirac equation, where the electrical charge $U(1)$ symmetry constrains and removes these freedoms.

== Definition ==
The Majorana equation can be written in several distinct forms:

- As the Dirac equation written so that the Dirac operator is purely Hermitian, thus giving purely real solutions.
- As an operator that relates a four-component spinor to its charge conjugate.
- As a 2×2 differential equation acting on a complex two-component spinor, resembling the Weyl equation with a properly Lorentz covariant mass term.

These three forms are equivalent, and can be derived from one-another. Each offers slightly different insight into the nature of the equation. The first form emphasises that purely real solutions can be found. The second form clarifies the role of charge conjugation. The third form provides the most direct contact with the representation theory of the Lorentz group.

=== Purely real four-component form ===
The conventional starting point is to state that "the Dirac equation can be written in Hermitian form", when the gamma matrices are taken in the Majorana representation. The Dirac equation is then written as

$$\left(\, -i\,\frac{\partial}{\partial t} - i\,\hat\alpha\cdot\nabla + \beta\, m\,\right)\,\psi = 0$$

with $\hat\alpha$ being purely real 4×4 symmetric matrices, and $\beta$ being purely imaginary skew-symmetric; as required to ensure that the operator (that part inside the parentheses) is Hermitian. In this case, purely real 4‑spinor solutions to the equation can be found; these are the Majorana spinors.

=== Charge-conjugate four-component form ===
The Majorana equation is

$$i \, {\partial\!\!\!\big /} \psi - m\, \psi_c = 0~$$

with the derivative operator ${\partial\!\!\!\big /}$ written in Feynman slash notation to include the gamma matrices as well as a summation over the spinor components. The spinor $\,\psi_c\,$ is the charge conjugate of $\,\psi\,.$ By construction, charge conjugates are necessarily given by

$$\psi_c = \eta_c\, C\, {\overline\psi}^\mathsf{T}~$$

where $\,(\cdot)^\mathsf{T}\,$ denotes the transpose, $\,\eta_c\,$ is an arbitrary phase factor $\,|\eta_c| = 1\,,$ conventionally taken as $\, \eta_c = 1 \,,$ and $\,C\,$ is a 4×4 matrix, the charge conjugation matrix. The matrix representation of $\,C\,$ depends on the choice of the representation of the gamma matrices. By convention, the conjugate spinor is written as

$$\overline\psi = \psi^\dagger\, \gamma^0~.$$

A number of algebraic identities follow from the charge conjugation matrix $C.$ (Note: Caution: Not all authors use the same conventions for charge conjugation, and so there is plenty of room for subtle sign errors. This article, and the article on charge conjugation, use the conventions of Itzykson & Zuber, (Quantum Field Theory, see Chapter 2 and Appendix A). These differ very slightly from Bjorken & Drell Relativistic Quantum Mechanics and so allowances must be made if comparing the two.) One states that in any representation of the gamma matrices, including the Dirac, Weyl, and Majorana representations, that $\,C\,\gamma_\mu = -\gamma_\mu^\mathsf{T}\,C\,$ and so one may write

$$\psi_c = -\eta_c\, \gamma^0 \, C \,\psi^* ~$$

where $\,\psi^*\,$ is the complex conjugate of $\,\psi\,.$ The charge conjugation matrix $\,C\,$ also has the property that

$$C^{-1} = C^\dagger = C^\mathsf{T} = -C$$

in all representations (Dirac, chiral, Majorana). From this, and a fair bit of algebra, one may obtain the equivalent equation:

$$i\,{\partial\!\!\!\big /} \psi_c - m\,\psi = 0$$

Proof

This form is not entirely obvious, and so deserves a proof. Starting with

$$-i\,{\partial\!\!\!\big /} \psi + m\,\psi_c = 0$$

Expand $\,\psi_c = C\,{\overline\psi}^\mathsf{T}\,$:

$$-i\,{\partial\!\!\!\big /} \psi + m\,C\,{\overline\psi}^\mathsf{T} = 0$$

Multiply by $\,C\,$ use $\,C^2 = -1\,$:

$$-i\,C \,{\partial\!\!\!\big /} C^{-1}\,C\,\psi - m\,{\overline\psi}^\mathsf{T} = 0$$

Charge conjugation transposes the gamma matrices:

$$+i\,{\partial\!\!\!\big /}^\mathsf{T} \,C\,\psi - m\,\left(\gamma^0\right)^\mathsf{T}\,\psi^* = 0$$

Take the complex conjugate:

$$-i\,{\partial\!\!\!\big /}^\dagger C^*\,\psi^* - m\,\left(\gamma^0\right)^\dagger\,\psi = 0$$

The matrix $\,\gamma^0\,$ is Hermitian, $\,\left(\gamma^0\right)^\dagger = \gamma^0\,$ in all three representations (Dirac, chiral, Majorana):

$$-i\,{\partial\!\!\!\big /}^\dagger C^*\,\psi^* - m\,\gamma^0\,\psi = 0$$

It is also an involution, taking the Hermitian conjugate: $\,\gamma^0\,\gamma^\mu\,\gamma^0 = \left(\gamma^\mu\right)^\dagger$

$$-i\,\gamma^0\,{\partial\!\!\!\big /} \gamma^0\,C^*\,\psi^* - m\,\gamma^0\,\psi = 0$$

Multiply by $\,\gamma^0\,$, note that $\,\left(\gamma^0\right)^2 = I\,$ and make use of $\,C^* = C\,$:

$$-i\,{\partial\!\!\!\big /} \gamma^0\,C\,\psi^* - m\,\psi = 0$$

The above is just the definition of the conjugate, so conclude that

$$i\,{\partial\!\!\!\big /} \psi_c - m\,\psi = 0$$

A detailed discussion of the physical interpretation of matrix $C$ as charge conjugation can be found in the article on charge conjugation. In short, it is involved in mapping particles to their antiparticles, which includes, among other things, the reversal of the electric charge. Although $\psi^c$ is defined as "the charge conjugate" of $\psi,$ the charge conjugation operator has not one but two eigenvalues. This allows a second spinor, the ELKO spinor to be defined. This is discussed in greater detail below.

=== Complex two-component form ===
The Majorana operator, $\,\mathrm{D}_\text{L}\,,$ is defined as

$$\mathrm{D}_\text{L} \equiv i\, \overline{\sigma}^\mu\,\partial_\mu + \eta\, m\, \omega\, K$$

where

$$\overline{\sigma}^\mu = \begin{bmatrix} \sigma^0 & -\sigma^1 & -\sigma^2 & -\sigma^3 \end{bmatrix} = \begin{bmatrix} I_2 & -\sigma_\text{x} & -\sigma_\text{y} & -\sigma_\text{z} \end{bmatrix}$$

is a vector whose components are the 2×2 identity matrix $\,I_2\,$ for $\,\mu = 0\,$ and (minus) the Pauli matrices for $\,\mu \in \{1,\, 2,\, 3\}\,.$ The $\,\eta\,$ is an arbitrary phase factor, $\,|\eta| = 1\, ,$ typically taken to be one: $\,\eta = 1\,.$ The $\,\omega\,$ is a 2×2 matrix that can be interpreted as the symplectic form for the symplectic group $\, \operatorname{Sp}(2, \mathbb{C})\, ,$ which is a double covering of the Lorentz group. It is

$$\omega = i\, \sigma_2 = \begin{bmatrix} 0 & 1 \\ -1 & 0 \end{bmatrix}~,$$

which happens to be isomorphic to the imaginary unit "i" (i.e. $\omega^2 = - I \,$ and $\, a\, I + b\, \omega \cong a + b\, i \in \mathbb{C}\,$ for $\, a, b \in \mathbb{R}$) with the matrix transpose being the analog of complex conjugation.

Finally, the $\,K\,$ is a short-hand reminder to take the complex conjugate. The Majorana equation for a left-handed complex-valued two-component spinor $\,\psi_\text{L}\,$ is then

$$\mathrm{D}_\text{L} \psi_\text{L} = 0$$

or, equivalently,

$$i\, \overline{\sigma}^\mu\, \partial_\mu \psi_\text{L}(x) + \eta\, m\, \omega\, \psi^*_\text{L}(x) = 0$$

with $\,\psi^*_\text{L}(x)\,$ the complex conjugate of $\,\psi_\text{L}(x)\,.$ The subscript L is used throughout this section to denote a left-handed chiral spinor; under a parity transformation, this can be taken to a right-handed spinor, and so one also has a right-handed form of the equation. This applies to the four-component equation as well; further details are presented below.

== Key ideas ==
Some of the properties of the Majorana equation, its solution and its Lagrangian formulation are summarized here.

- The Majorana equation is similar to the Dirac equation, in the sense that it involves four-component spinors, gamma matrices, and mass terms, but includes the charge conjugate $\psi_c$ of a spinor $\psi$. In contrast, the Weyl equation is for two-component spinor without mass.
- Solutions to the Majorana equation can be interpreted as electrically neutral particles that are their own anti-particle. By convention, the charge conjugation operator takes particles to their anti-particles, and so the Majorana spinor is conventionally defined as the solution where $\psi=\psi_c.$ That is, the Majorana spinor is "its own antiparticle". Insofar as charge conjugation takes an electrically charge particle to its anti-particle with opposite charge, one must conclude that the Majorana spinor is electrically neutral.
- The Majorana equation is Lorentz covariant, and a variety of Lorentz scalars can be constructed from its spinors. This allows several distinct Lagrangians to be constructed for Majorana fields.
- When the Lagrangian is expressed in terms of two-component left and right chiral spinors, it may contain three distinct mass terms: left and right Majorana mass terms, and a Dirac mass term. These manifest physically as two distinct masses; this is the key idea of the seesaw mechanism for describing low-mass neutrinos with a left-handed coupling to the Standard model, with the right-handed component corresponding to a sterile neutrino at GUT-scale masses.
- The discrete symmetries of C, P and T conjugation are intimately controlled by a freely chosen phase factor on the charge conjugation operator. This manifests itself as distinct complex phases on the mass terms. This allows both CP-symmetric and CP-violating Lagrangians to be written.
- The Majorana fields are CPT invariant, but the invariance is, in a sense "freer" than it is for charged particles. This is because charge is necessarily a Lorentz-invariant property, and is thus constrained for charged fields. The neutral Majorana fields are not constrained in this way, and can mix.

== Two-component Majorana equation ==
The Majorana equation can be written both in terms of a real four-component spinor, and as a complex two-component spinor. Both can be constructed from the Weyl equation, with the addition of a properly Lorentz-covariant mass term. This section provides an explicit construction and articulation.

=== Weyl equation ===
The Weyl equation describes the time evolution of a massless complex-valued two-component spinor. It is conventionally written as

$$\sigma^\mu\partial_\mu \psi = 0$$

Written out explicitly, it is

$$I_2 \frac{\partial \psi}{\partial t} + \sigma_x\frac{\partial \psi}{\partial x} + \sigma_y\frac{\partial \psi}{\partial y} + \sigma_z\frac{\partial \psi}{\partial z} = 0$$

The Pauli four-vector is

$$\sigma^\mu = \begin{pmatrix} \sigma^0 & \sigma^1 & \sigma^2 & \sigma^3 \end{pmatrix} = \begin{pmatrix} I_2 & \sigma_x & \sigma_y & \sigma_z \end{pmatrix}$$

that is, a vector whose components are the 2 × 2 identity matrix $I_2$ for μ = 0 and the Pauli matrices for μ = 1, 2, 3. Under the parity transformation $\vec x\to {\vec x}^\prime = -\vec x$ one obtains a dual equation

$$\bar{\sigma}^\mu\partial_\mu \psi = 0$$

where
$$\bar{\sigma}^\mu = \begin{pmatrix} I_2 & -\sigma_x & -\sigma_y & -\sigma_z \end{pmatrix}$$
. These are two distinct forms of the Weyl equation; their solutions are distinct as well. It can be shown that the solutions have left-handed and right-handed helicity, and thus chirality. It is conventional to label these two distinct forms explicitly, thus:

$$\sigma^\mu\partial_\mu \psi_{\rm R} = 0 \qquad
\bar{\sigma}^\mu\partial_\mu \psi_{\rm L} = 0~.$$

=== Lorentz invariance ===
The Weyl equation describes a massless particle; the Majorana equation adds a mass term. The mass must be introduced in a Lorentz invariant fashion. This is achieved by observing that the special linear group $\operatorname{SL}(2,\mathbb{C})$ is isomorphic to the symplectic group $\operatorname{Sp}(2, \mathbb{C}).$ Both of these groups are double covers of the Lorentz group $\operatorname{SO}(1,3).$ The Lorentz invariance of the derivative term (from the Weyl equation) is conventionally worded in terms of the action of the group $\operatorname{SL}(2, \mathbb{C})$ on spinors, whereas the Lorentz invariance of the mass term requires invocation of the defining relation for the symplectic group.

The double-covering of the Lorentz group is given by

$$\overline{\sigma}_\mu {\Lambda^\mu}_\nu = S \overline{\sigma}_\nu S^\dagger$$

where $\Lambda \in \operatorname{SO}(1,3)$ and $S \in \operatorname{SL}(2, \mathbb{C})$ and $S^\dagger$ is the Hermitian transpose. This is used to relate the transformation properties of the differentials under a Lorentz transformation $x \mapsto x^\prime = \Lambda x$ to the transformation properties of the spinors.

The symplectic group $\operatorname{Sp}(2, \mathbb{C})$ is defined as the set of all complex 2×2 matrices $S$ that satisfy

$$\omega^{-1} S^\textsf{T} \omega = S^{-1}$$

where

$$\omega = i\sigma_2 = \begin{bmatrix} 0 & 1 \\ -1 & 0 \end{bmatrix}$$

is a skew-symmetric matrix. It is used to define a symplectic bilinear form on $\mathbb{C}^2.$ Writing a pair of arbitrary two-vectors $u, v \in \mathbb{C}^2$ as

$$u = \begin{pmatrix} u_1 \\ u_2 \end{pmatrix} \qquad
v = \begin{pmatrix} v_1 \\ v_2 \end{pmatrix}$$

the symplectic product is

$$\langle u, v\rangle = -\langle v, u\rangle = u_1 v_2 - u_2 v_1 = u^\textsf{T} \omega v$$

where $u^\textsf{T}$ is the transpose of $u~.$ This form is invariant under Lorentz transformations, in that

$$\langle u, v\rangle = \langle Su, Sv\rangle$$

The skew matrix takes the Pauli matrices to minus their transpose:

$$\omega \sigma_k \omega^{-1} = -\sigma_k^\textsf{T}$$

for $k = 1, 2, 3.$ The skew matrix can be interpreted as the product of a parity transformation and a transposition acting on two-spinors. However, as will be emphasized in a later section, it can also be interpreted as one of the components of the charge conjugation operator, the other component being complex conjugation. Applying it to the Lorentz transformation yields

$$\sigma_\mu {\Lambda^\mu}_\nu = \left(S^{-1}\right)^\dagger \sigma_\nu S^{-1}$$

These two variants describe the covariance properties of the differentials acting on the left and right spinors, respectively.

=== Differentials ===
Under the Lorentz transformation $x \mapsto x^\prime = \Lambda x$ the differential term transforms as

$$\sigma^\mu\frac{\partial}{\partial x^\mu} \psi_{\rm R}(x)
\mapsto
\sigma^\mu\frac{\partial}{\partial x^{\prime\mu}} \psi_{\rm R}(x^\prime)
= \left(S^{-1}\right)^\dagger \sigma^\mu\frac{\partial}{\partial x^\mu} \psi_{\rm R}(x)$$

provided that the right-handed field transforms as

$$\psi_{\rm R}(x) \mapsto \psi^\prime_{\rm R}(x^\prime)= S\psi_{\rm R}(x)$$

Similarly, the left-handed differential transforms as

$$\overline{\sigma}^\mu\frac{\partial}{\partial x^\mu} \psi_{\rm L}(x)
\mapsto
\overline{\sigma}^\mu\frac{\partial}{\partial x^{\prime\mu}} \psi_{\rm L}(x^\prime)
= S \overline{\sigma}^\mu\frac{\partial}{\partial x^\mu} \psi_{\rm L}(x)$$

provided that the left-handed spinor transforms as

$$\psi_{\rm L}(x) \mapsto \psi^\prime_{\rm L}(x^\prime)= \left(S^\dagger\right)^{-1}\psi_{\rm L}(x)$$

Proof

These transformation properties are not particularly "obvious", and so deserve a careful derivation. Begin with the form

$$\psi_{\rm R}(x) \mapsto \psi^\prime_{\rm R}(x^\prime) = R\psi_{\rm R}(x)$$

for some unknown $R \in \mathrm{SL}(2,\mathbb{C})$ to be determined. The Lorentz transform, in coordinates, is

$$x^{\prime\mu} = {\Lambda^\mu}_\nu x^\nu$$

or, equivalently,

$$x^\nu = {\left(\Lambda^{-1}\right)^\nu}_\mu x^{\prime\mu}$$

This leads to

$$\begin{align}
&\sigma^\mu \partial^\prime_\mu \psi_{\rm R}(x^\prime) \\
{}={} &\sigma^\mu \frac{\partial}{\partial x^{\prime\mu}} \psi_{\rm R}(x^\prime) \\
{}={} &\sigma^\mu \frac{\partial x^\nu}{\partial x^{\prime\mu}} \frac{\partial}{\partial x^\nu} R \psi_{\rm R}(x) \\
{}={} &\sigma^\mu {\left(\Lambda^{-1}\right)^\nu}_\mu \frac{\partial}{\partial x^\nu} R\psi_{\rm R}(x) \\
{}={} &\sigma^\mu {\left(\Lambda^{-1}\right)^\nu}_\mu \partial_\nu R\psi_{\rm R}(x)
\end{align}$$

In order to make use of the Weyl map

$$\sigma_\mu {\Lambda^\mu}_\nu = \left(S^{-1}\right)^\dagger \sigma_\nu S^{-1}$$

a few indexes must be raised and lowered. This is easier said than done, as it invokes the identity

$$\eta\Lambda^T\eta = \Lambda^{-1}$$

where $\eta = \operatorname{diag}(+1, -1, -1, -1)$ is the flat-space Minkowski metric. The above identity is often used to define the elements $\Lambda \in \operatorname{SO}(1,3).$ One takes the transpose:

$${\left(\Lambda^{-1}\right)^\nu}_\mu = {\left(\Lambda^{-1T}\right)_\mu}^\nu$$

to write

$$\begin{align}
&\sigma^\mu {\left(\Lambda^{-1}\right)^\nu}_\mu \partial_\nu R\psi_{\rm R}(x) \\
{}={} &\sigma^\mu {\left(\Lambda^{-1T}\right)_\mu}^\nu \partial_\nu R\psi_{\rm R}(x) \\
{}={} &\sigma_\mu {\Lambda^\mu}_\nu \partial^\nu R\psi_{\rm R}(x) \\
{}={} &\left(S^{-1}\right)^\dagger \sigma_\mu \partial^\mu S^{-1} R\psi_{\rm R}(x)
\end{align}$$

One thus regains the original form if $S^{-1}R = 1,$ that is, $R = S.$ Performing the same manipulations for the left-handed equation, one concludes that

$$\psi_{\rm L}(x) \mapsto \psi^\prime_{\rm L}(x^\prime) = L\psi_{\rm L}(x)$$

with $L = \left(S^\dagger\right)^{-1}.$ (Note: The results presented here are identical to those of Aste, op. cit., equations 52 and 57, although the derivation performed here is completely different. The double-covering used here is also identical to Aste equations 48, and to the current version (December 2020) of the article on Lorentz group.)

=== Mass term ===
The complex conjugate of the right handed spinor field transforms as

$$\psi^*_{\rm R}(x) \mapsto \psi^{\prime *}_{\rm R}(x^\prime) = S^*\psi^*_{\rm R}(x)$$

The defining relationship for $\operatorname{Sp}(2, \mathbb{C})$ can be rewritten as $\omega S^* = \left(S^\dagger\right)^{-1} \omega\,.$ From this, one concludes that the skew-complex field transforms as

$$m\omega\psi^*_{\rm R}(x) \mapsto m\omega\psi^{\prime *}_{\rm R}(x^\prime) = \left(S^\dagger\right)^{-1} m\omega\psi^*_{\rm R}(x)$$

This is fully compatible with the covariance property of the differential. Taking $\eta = e^{i\phi}$ to be an arbitrary complex phase factor, the linear combination

$$i\sigma^\mu \partial_\mu \psi_{\rm R}(x) + \eta m\omega\psi^*_{\rm R}(x)$$

transforms in a covariant fashion. Setting this to zero gives the complex two-component Majorana equation for the right-handed field. Similarly, the left-chiral Majorana equation (including an arbitrary phase factor $\zeta$) is

$$i\overline{\sigma}^\mu \partial_\mu \psi_{\rm L}(x) + \zeta m\omega\psi^*_{\rm L}(x) = 0$$

The left and right chiral versions are related by a parity transformation. As shown below, these square to the Klein–Gordon operator only if $\eta = \zeta.$ The skew complex conjugate $\omega\psi^* = i\sigma^2\psi$ can be recognized as the charge conjugate form of $\psi~ ;$ this is articulated in greater detail below. Thus, the Majorana equation can be read as an equation that connects a spinor to its charge-conjugate form.

=== Left and right Majorana operators ===
Define a pair of operators, the Majorana operators,

$$\begin{align}
\mathrm{D}_{\rm L} &= i\overline{\sigma}^\mu \partial_\mu + \zeta m\omega K &
\mathrm{D}_{\rm R} &= i\sigma^\mu \partial_\mu + \eta m\omega K
\end{align}$$

where $K$ is a short-hand reminder to take the complex conjugate. Under Lorentz transformations, these transform as

$$\begin{align}
\mathrm{D}_{\rm L} \mapsto \mathrm{D}^\prime_{\rm L} &= S \mathrm{D}_{\rm L} S^\dagger &
\mathrm{D}_{\rm R} \mapsto \mathrm{D}^\prime_{\rm R} &= \left(S^\dagger\right)^{-1} \mathrm{D}_{\rm R} S^{-1}
\end{align}$$

whereas the Weyl spinors transform as

$$\begin{align}
\psi_{\rm L} \mapsto \psi^\prime_{\rm L} &= \left(S^\dagger\right)^{-1} \psi_{\rm L} &
\psi_{\rm R} \mapsto \psi^\prime_{\rm R} &= S \psi_{\rm R}
\end{align}$$

just as above. Thus, the matched combinations of these are Lorentz covariant, and one may take

$$\begin{align}
\mathrm{D}_{\rm L} \psi_{\rm L} &= 0 &
\mathrm{D}_{\rm R} \psi_{\rm R} &= 0
\end{align}$$

as a pair of complex 2-spinor Majorana equations.

The products $\mathrm{D}_{\rm L} \mathrm{D}_{\rm R}$ and $\mathrm{D}_{\rm R} \mathrm{D}_{\rm L}$ are both Lorentz covariant. The product is explicitly

$$\mathrm{D}_{\rm R} \mathrm{D}_{\rm L}
= \left(i\sigma^\mu \partial_\mu + \eta m\omega K\right) \left(i\overline{\sigma}^\mu \partial_\mu + \zeta m\omega K\right)
= - \left(\partial_t^2 - \vec\nabla \cdot \vec\nabla + \eta\zeta^* m^2\right)
= - \left(\square + \eta\zeta^* m^2\right)$$

Verifying this requires keeping in mind that $\omega^2 = -1$ and that $Ki = -iK~.$ The RHS reduces to the Klein–Gordon operator provided that $\eta\zeta^* = 1$, that is, $\eta = \zeta~.$ These two Majorana operators are thus "square roots" of the Klein–Gordon operator.

== Four-component Majorana equation ==
The real four-component version of the Majorana equation can be constructed from the complex two-component equation as follows. Given the complex field $\psi_{\rm L}$ satisfying $\mathrm{D}_{\rm L} \psi_{\rm L} = 0$ as above, define

$$\chi_{\rm R} \equiv -\eta \omega \psi^*_{\rm L}$$

Using the algebraic machinery given above, it is not hard to show that

$$\left(i \sigma^\mu \partial_\mu - \eta m\omega K\right)\chi_{\rm R} = 0$$

Defining a conjugate operator

$$\delta_{\rm R} = i \sigma^\mu \partial_\mu - \eta m\omega K$$

The four-component Majorana equation is then

$$\left(\mathrm{D}_{\rm L} \oplus \delta_{\rm R} \right)\left(\psi_{\rm L} \oplus \chi_{\rm R}\right) = 0$$

Writing this out in detail, one has

$$\mathrm{D}_{\rm L} \oplus \delta_{\rm R} =
\begin{bmatrix} \mathrm{D}_{\rm L} & 0 \\ 0 & \delta_{\rm R} \end{bmatrix} =
i \begin{bmatrix} I & 0 \\ 0 & I \end{bmatrix} \partial_t
+ i \begin{bmatrix} -\sigma^k & 0 \\ 0 & \sigma^k \end{bmatrix} \nabla_k
+ m \begin{bmatrix} \eta \omega K & 0 \\ 0 & -\eta \omega K \end{bmatrix}$$

Multiplying on the left by

$$\beta = \gamma^0 =\begin{bmatrix} 0 & I \\ I & 0 \end{bmatrix}$$

brings the above into a matrix form wherein the gamma matrices in the chiral representation can be recognized. This is

$$\beta \left(\mathrm{D}_{\rm L} \oplus \delta_{\rm R}\right) =
\begin{bmatrix} 0 & \delta_{\rm R} \\ \mathrm{D}_{\rm L} & 0 \end{bmatrix} =
i \beta \partial_t +
i \begin{bmatrix} 0 & \sigma^k \\ - \sigma^k & 0 \end{bmatrix} \nabla_k -
m \begin{bmatrix} 0 & \eta \omega K \\ -\eta \omega K & 0 \end{bmatrix}$$

That is,

$$\beta \left(\mathrm{D}_{\rm L} \oplus \delta_{\rm R}\right) =
i\gamma^\mu \partial_\mu - m \begin{bmatrix} 0 & \eta \omega K \\ -\eta \omega K & 0 \end{bmatrix}$$

Applying this to the 4-spinor

$$\psi_{\rm L} \oplus \chi_{\rm R}
= \begin{pmatrix} \psi_{\rm L} \\ \chi_{\rm R} \end{pmatrix}
= \begin{pmatrix} \psi_{\rm L} \\ -\eta\omega\psi^*_{\rm L} \end{pmatrix}$$

and recalling that $\omega^2 = -1$ one finds that the spinor is an eigenstate of the mass term,

$$\begin{bmatrix} 0 & \eta \omega K \\ -\eta \omega K & 0 \end{bmatrix}
\begin{pmatrix} \psi_{\rm L} \\ -\eta\omega\psi^*_{\rm L} \end{pmatrix} =
\begin{pmatrix} \psi_{\rm L} \\ -\eta\omega\psi^*_{\rm L} \end{pmatrix}$$

and so, for this particular spinor, the four-component Majorana equation reduces to the Dirac equation

$$\left(i\gamma^\mu \partial_\mu - m\right) \begin{pmatrix}
\psi_{\rm L} \\
-\eta\omega\psi^*_{\rm L}
\end{pmatrix} = 0$$

The skew matrix can be identified with the charge conjugation operator (in the Weyl basis). Explicitly, this is

$$\mathsf{C} = \begin{bmatrix} 0 & \eta \omega K \\ -\eta \omega K & 0 \end{bmatrix}$$

Given an arbitrary four-component spinor $\psi ~,$ its charge conjugate is

$$\mathsf{C} \psi = \psi^c = \eta C \overline{\psi}^\textsf{T}$$

with $C$ an ordinary 4×4 matrix, having a form explicitly given in the article on gamma matrices. In conclusion, the 4-component Majorana equation can be written as

$$\begin{align}
0 &= \left(i\gamma^\mu \partial_\mu - m\mathsf{C}\right)\psi \\
&= i\gamma^\mu \partial_\mu \psi - m\psi^c
\end{align}$$

== Charge conjugation and parity ==
The charge conjugation operator appears directly in the 4-component version of the Majorana equation. When the spinor field is a charge conjugate of itself, that is, when $\psi^c = \psi,$ then the Majorana equation reduces to the Dirac equation, and any solution can be interpreted as describing an electrically neutral field. However, the charge conjugation operator has not one, but two distinct eigenstates, one of which is the ELKO spinor; it does not solve the Majorana equation, but rather, a sign-flipped version of it.

The charge conjugation operator $\mathsf{C}$ for a four-component spinor is defined as

$$\mathsf{C}\psi = \psi_c = \eta C\left(\overline \psi\right)^\textsf{T}$$

A general discussion of the physical interpretation of this operator in terms of electrical charge is given in the article on charge conjugation. Additional discussions are provided by Bjorken & Drell or Itzykson & Zuber. (Note: Itzykson and Zuber, op. cit. (Chapter 2-4)) In more abstract terms, it is the spinorial equivalent of complex conjugation of the $U(1)$ coupling of the electromagnetic field. This can be seen as follows. If one has a single, real scalar field, it cannot couple to electromagnetism; however, a pair of real scalar fields, arranged as a complex number, can. For scalar fields, charge conjugation is the same as complex conjugation. The discrete symmetries of the $U(1)$ gauge theory follows from the "trivial" observation that

$$*: U(1) \to U(1)\quad e^{i\phi}\mapsto
e^{-i\phi}$$

is an automorphism of $U(1).$ For spinorial fields, the situation is more confusing. Roughly speaking, however, one can say that the Majorana field is electrically neutral, and that taking an appropriate combination of two Majorana fields can be interpreted as a single electrically charged Dirac field. The charge conjugation operator given above corresponds to the automorphism of $U(1).$

In the above, $C$ is a 4×4 matrix, given in the article on the gamma matrices. Its explicit form is representation-dependent. The operator $\mathsf{C}$ cannot be written as a 4×4 matrix, as it is taking the complex conjugate of $\psi$, and complex conjugation cannot be achieved with a complex 4×4 matrix. It can be written as a real 8×8 matrix, presuming one also writes $\psi$ as a purely real 8-component spinor. Letting $K$ stand for complex conjugation, so that $K(x + iy) = x - iy,$ one can then write, for four-component spinors,

$$\mathsf{C} = -\eta \gamma^0 CK$$

It is not hard to show that $\mathsf{C}^2 = 1$ and that $\mathsf{C}\gamma^\mu \mathsf{C} = -\gamma^\mu~.$ It follows from the first identity that $\mathsf{C}$ has two eigenvalues, which may be written as

$$\mathsf{C}\psi^{(\pm)} = \pm \psi^{(\pm)}$$

The eigenvectors are readily found in the Weyl basis. From the above, in this basis, $\mathsf{C}$ is explicitly

$$\mathsf{C} = \begin{bmatrix} 0 & \eta \omega K \\ -\eta \omega K & 0 \end{bmatrix}$$

and thus

$$\psi^{(\pm)}_\text{Weyl} = \begin{pmatrix} \psi_{\rm L} \\ \mp\eta \omega\psi_{\rm L}^* \end{pmatrix}$$

Both eigenvectors are clearly solutions to the Majorana equation. However, only the positive eigenvector is a solution to the Dirac equation:

$$0 = \left(i\gamma^\mu \partial_\mu - m\mathsf{C}\right)\psi^{(+)} = \left(i\gamma^\mu \partial_\mu - m\right)\psi^{(+)}$$

The negative eigenvector "doesn't work", it has the incorrect sign on the Dirac mass term. It still solves the Klein–Gordon equation, however. The negative eigenvector is termed the ELKO spinor.

Proof

That both eigenstates solve the Klein–Gordon equation follows from the earlier identities for the two-component versions. Defining, as before,

$$\mathrm{D}_{\rm L} = i\overline{\sigma}^\mu \partial_\mu + \eta m\omega K \qquad
\mathrm{D}_{\rm R} = i\sigma^\mu \partial_\mu + \eta m\omega K$$

As was previously shown

$$\mathrm{D}_{\rm R} \mathrm{D}_{\rm L} = \mathrm{D}_{\rm L}\mathrm{D}_{\rm R} = -\left(\square + m^2\right)$$

The four-component spinor requires the introduction of

$$\delta_{\rm L} = i\overline{\sigma}^\mu \partial_\mu - \eta m\omega K \qquad
\delta_{\rm R} = i\sigma^\mu \partial_\mu - \eta m\omega K$$

which also obey

$$\delta_{\rm R} \delta_{\rm L} = \delta_{\rm L} \delta_{\rm R} = -\left(\square + m^2\right)$$

Therefore

$$\left(\mathrm{D}_{\rm R} \oplus \delta_{\rm L}\right)\left(\mathrm{D}_{\rm L} \oplus \delta_{\rm R}\right) = -\left(\square + m^2\right)$$

The chiral representation requires an extra factor of $\beta = \gamma^0$:

$$\beta \left(\mathrm{D}_{\rm L} \oplus \delta_{\rm R}\right) = i\gamma^\mu \partial_\mu - m\mathsf{C} \qquad
\beta \left(\delta_{\rm L} \oplus \mathrm{D}_{\rm R}\right) = i\gamma^\mu \partial_\mu + m\mathsf{C}$$

and so one concludes that

$$\left(\mathrm{D}_{\rm R} \oplus \delta_{\rm L}\right)\left(\mathrm{D}_{\rm L} \oplus \delta_{\rm R}\right)
= \left(i\gamma^\mu \partial_\mu + m\mathsf{C}\right)\left(i\gamma^\mu \partial_\mu - m\mathsf{C}\right)
= - \left(\square + m^2\right)$$

That is, both eigenvectors of the charge conjugation operator solve the Klein–Gordon equation. The last identity can also be verified directly, by noting that $\mathsf{C}i = -i\mathsf{C}$ and that $\mathsf{C}\gamma^\mu = -\gamma^\mu\mathsf{C}~.$

=== Parity ===
Under parity, the left-handed spinors transform to right-handed spinors. The two eigenvectors of the charge conjugation operator, again in the Weyl basis, are

$$\psi^{(\pm)}_{\rm{R}, \text{Weyl}} = \begin{pmatrix} \pm \eta\omega\psi_{\rm R}^* \\ \psi_{\rm R} \end{pmatrix}$$

As before, both solve the four-component Majorana equation, but only one also solves the Dirac equation. This can be shown by constructing the parity-dual four-component equation. This takes the form

$$\beta \left(\delta_{\rm L} \oplus \mathrm{D}_{\rm R}\right) = i\gamma^\mu \partial_\mu + m\mathsf{C}$$

where

$$\delta_{\rm L} = i\overline{\sigma}^\mu \partial_\mu - \eta m\omega K$$

Given the two-component spinor $\psi_{\rm R}$ define its conjugate as $\chi_{\rm L} = -\eta \omega\psi^*_{\rm R}.$ It is not hard to show that $\mathrm{D}_{\rm R} \psi_{\rm R} = -\eta\omega (\delta_{\rm L} \chi_{\rm L})$ and that therefore, if $\mathrm{D}_{\rm R} \psi_{\rm R} = 0$ then also $\delta_{\rm L} \chi_{\rm L} = 0$ and therefore that

$$0 = \left(\delta_{\rm L} \oplus \mathrm{D}_{\rm R}\right) \left(\chi_{\rm L} \oplus \psi_{\rm R}\right)$$

or equivalently

$$0 = (i\gamma^\mu \partial_\mu + m\mathsf{C}) \begin{pmatrix} \chi_{\rm L} \\ \psi_{\rm R} \end{pmatrix}$$

This works, because $\mathsf{C} (\chi_{\rm L} \oplus \psi_{\rm R} ) = -(\chi_{\rm L} \oplus \psi_{\rm R} )$ and so this reduces to the Dirac equation for

$$\psi^{(-)}_{{\rm R}, \text{Weyl}} = \chi_{\rm L} \oplus \psi_{\rm R} = \begin{pmatrix} \chi_{\rm L}\\ \psi_{\rm R} \end{pmatrix}$$

To conclude, and reiterate, the Majorana equation is

$$0 = \left(i\gamma^\mu \partial_\mu - m\mathsf{C}\right)\psi = i\gamma^\mu \partial_\mu\psi - m\psi_c$$

It has four inequivalent, linearly independent solutions, $\psi^{(\pm)}_{\rm L,R}.$ Of these, only two are also solutions to the Dirac equation: namely $\psi^{(+)}_{\rm L}$ and $\psi^{(-)}_{\rm R}~ .$

== Solutions ==
=== Spin eigenstates ===
One convenient starting point for writing the solutions is to work in the rest frame way of the spinors. Writing the quantum Hamiltonian with the conventional sign convention $H = i\partial_t$ leads to the Majorana equation taking the form

$$i\partial_t \psi = -i\vec\alpha \cdot \nabla\psi + m\beta\psi_c$$

In the chiral (Weyl) basis, one has that

$$\gamma^0 = \beta = \begin{pmatrix} 0 & I \\ I & 0 \end{pmatrix},\quad \vec\alpha = \begin{pmatrix} \vec\sigma & 0 \\ 0 & -\vec\sigma \end{pmatrix}$$

with $\vec\sigma$ the Pauli vector. The sign convention here is consistent with the article gamma matrices. Plugging in the positive charge conjugation eigenstate $\psi^{(+)}_\text{Weyl}$ given above, one obtains an equation for the two-component spinor

$$i\partial_t \psi_{\rm L} = -i\vec\sigma\cdot\nabla \psi_{\rm L} + m(i\sigma_2 \psi_{\rm L}^*)$$

and likewise

$$i\partial_t (i\sigma_2 \psi_{\rm L}^*) = +i\vec\sigma\cdot\nabla (i\sigma_2 \psi_{\rm L}^*) + m\psi_{\rm L}$$

These two are in fact the same equation, which can be verified by noting that $\sigma_2$ yields the complex conjugate of the Pauli matrices:

$$\sigma_2 \left(\vec k \cdot \vec \sigma\right) \sigma_2 = -\vec k \cdot \vec \sigma^*.$$

The plane wave solutions can be developed for the energy-momentum $\left(k_0, \vec k\right)$ and are most easily stated in the rest frame. The spin-up rest-frame solution is

$$\psi_{\rm L}^{(u)} = \begin{pmatrix} e^{-imt} \\ e^{imt} \end{pmatrix}$$

while the spin-down solution is

$$\psi_{\rm L}^{(d)} = \begin{pmatrix} e^{imt} \\ -e^{-imt} \end{pmatrix}$$

That these are being correctly interpreted can be seen by re-expressing them in the Dirac basis, as Dirac spinors. In this case, they take the form

$$\psi^{(u)}_\text{Dirac} = \begin{bmatrix} e^{-imt} \\ 0 \\ 0 \\ -e^{imt} \end{bmatrix}$$

and

$$\psi^{(d)}_\text{Dirac} = \begin{bmatrix} 0 \\ e^{-imt} \\ - e^{imt} \\ 0 \end{bmatrix}$$

These are the rest-frame spinors. They can be seen as a linear combination of both the positive and the negative-energy solutions to the Dirac equation. These are the only two solutions; the Majorana equation has only two linearly independent solutions, unlike the Dirac equation, which has four. The doubling of the degrees of freedom of the Dirac equation can be ascribed to the Dirac spinors carrying charge.

=== Momentum eigenstates ===
In a general momentum frame, the Majorana spinor can be written as

== Electric charge ==
The appearance of both $\psi$ and $\psi_c$ in the Majorana equation means that the field $\psi$ cannot be coupled to a charged electromagnetic field without violating charge conservation, since particles have the opposite charge to their own antiparticles. To satisfy this restriction, $\psi$ must be taken to be electrically neutral. This can be articulated in greater detail.

The Dirac equation can be written in a purely real form, when the gamma matrices are taken in the Majorana representation. The Dirac equation can then be written as (Note: Itzykson & Zuber, (See Chapter 2-1-2, page 49))

$$\left(-i\frac{\partial}{\partial t} -i\hat\alpha\cdot\nabla + \beta m\right)\psi = 0$$

with $\hat\alpha$ being purely real symmetric matrices, and $\beta$ being purely imaginary skew-symmetric. In this case, purely real solutions to the equation can be found; these are the Majorana spinors. Under the action of Lorentz transformations, these transform under the (purely real) spin group $\operatorname{Spin}(1, 3).$ This stands in contrast to the Dirac spinors, which are only covariant under the action of the complexified spin group $\operatorname{Spin}^\mathbb{C}(1,3).$ The interpretation is that complexified spin group encodes the electromagnetic potential, the real spin group does not.

This can also be stated in a different way: the Dirac equation, and the Dirac spinors contain a sufficient amount of gauge freedom to naturally encode electromagnetic interactions. This can be seen by noting that the electromagnetic potential can very simply be added to the Dirac equation without requiring any additional modifications or extensions to either the equation or the spinor. The location of this extra degree of freedom is pin-pointed by the charge conjugation operator, and the imposition of the Majorana constraint $\psi=\psi_c$ removes this extra degree of freedom. Once removed, there cannot be any coupling to the electromagnetic potential, ergo, the Majorana spinor is necessarily electrically neutral. An electromagnetic coupling can only be obtained by adding back in a complex-number-valued phase factor, and coupling this phase factor to the electromagnetic potential.

The above can be further sharpened by examining the situation in $(p,q)$ spatial dimensions. In this case, the complexified spin group $\operatorname{Spin}^\mathbb{C}(p,q)$ has a double covering by $\operatorname{SO}(p, q)\times S^1$ with $S^1\cong U(1)$ the circle. The implication is that $\operatorname{SO}(p, q)$ encodes the generalized Lorentz transformations (of course), while the circle can be identified with the $\mathrm{U}(1)$ action of the gauge group on electric charges. That is, the gauge-group action of the complexified spin group on a Dirac spinor can be split into a purely-real Lorentzian part, and an electromagnetic part. This can be further elaborated on non-flat (non-Minkowski-flat) spin manifolds. In this case, the Dirac operator acts on the spinor bundle. Decomposed into distinct terms, it includes the usual covariant derivative $d + A.$ The $A$ field can be seen to arise directly from the curvature of the complexified part of the spin bundle, in that the gauge transformations couple to the complexified part, and not the real-spinor part. That the $A$ field corresponds to the electromagnetic potential can be seen by noting that (for example) the square of the Dirac operator is the Laplacian plus the scalar curvature $R$ (of the underlying manifold that the spinor field sits on) plus the (electromagnetic) field strength $F=dA.$ For the Majorana case, one has only the Lorentz transformations acting on the Majorana spinor; the complexification plays no role. A detailed treatment of these topics can be found in Jost while the $(p,q)=(1,3)$ case is articulated in Bleeker. Unfortunately, neither text explicitly articulates the Majorana spinor in direct form.

== Field quanta ==
The quanta of the Majorana equation allow for two classes of particles, a neutral particle and its neutral antiparticle. The frequently applied supplemental condition $\Psi=\Psi_c$ corresponds to the Majorana spinor.

=== Majorana particle ===
Particles corresponding to Majorana spinors are known as Majorana particles, due to the above self-conjugacy constraint. All the fermions included in the Standard Model have been excluded as Majorana fermions (since they have non-zero electric charge they cannot be antiparticles of themselves) with the exception of the neutrino (which is neutral).

Theoretically, the neutrino is a possible exception to this pattern. If so, neutrinoless double-beta decay, as well as a range of lepton-number violating meson and charged lepton decays, are possible. A number of experiments probing whether the neutrino is a Majorana particle are currently underway.

== Additional reading ==
- "Majorana Legacy in Contemporary Physics ", Electronic Journal of Theoretical Physics (EJTP) Volume 3, Issue 10 (April 2006) Special issue for the Centenary of Ettore Majorana (1906-1938?). ISSN 1729-5254
- Frank Wilczek, (2009) "Majorana returns", Nature Physics Vol. 5 pages 614–618.
