= Charge conjugation =

Symmetry of physical laws under a charge-conjugation transformation

In physics, charge conjugation is a transformation that switches all particles with their corresponding antiparticles, thus changing the sign of all charges: not only electric charge but also the charges relevant to other forces. The term C-symmetry is an abbreviation of the phrase "charge conjugation symmetry", and is used in discussions of the symmetry of physical laws under charge-conjugation. Other important discrete symmetries are P-symmetry (parity) and T-symmetry (time reversal).

These discrete symmetries, C, P and T, are symmetries of the equations that describe the known fundamental forces of nature: electromagnetism, gravity, the strong and the weak interactions. Verifying whether some given mathematical equation correctly models nature requires giving physical interpretation not only to continuous symmetries, such as motion in time, but also to its discrete symmetries, and then determining whether nature adheres to these symmetries. Unlike the continuous symmetries, the interpretation of the discrete symmetries is a bit more intellectually demanding and confusing. An early surprise appeared in the 1950s, when Chien Shiung Wu demonstrated that the weak interaction violated P-symmetry. For several decades, it appeared that the combined symmetry CP was preserved, until CP-violating interactions were discovered. Both discoveries led to Nobel Prizes.

The C-symmetry is particularly troublesome, physically, as the universe is primarily filled with matter, not anti-matter, whereas the naive C-symmetry of the physical laws suggests that there should be equal amounts of both. It is currently believed that CP-violation during the early universe can account for the "excess" matter, although the debate is not settled. Earlier textbooks on cosmology, predating the 1970s, routinely suggested that perhaps distant galaxies were made entirely of anti-matter, thus maintaining a net balance of zero in the universe.

This article focuses on exposing and articulating the C-symmetry of various important equations and theoretical systems, including the Dirac equation and the structure of quantum field theory. The various fundamental particles can be classified according to behavior under charge conjugation; this is described in the article on C-parity.

== Informal overview ==
Charge conjugation occurs as a symmetry in three different but closely related settings: a symmetry of the (classical, non-quantized) solutions of several notable differential equations, including the Klein–Gordon equation and the Dirac equation, a symmetry of the corresponding quantum fields, and in a general setting, a symmetry in (pseudo-)Riemannian geometry. In all three cases, the symmetry is ultimately revealed to be a symmetry under complex conjugation, although exactly what is being conjugated where can be at times obfuscated, depending on notation, coordinate choices and other factors.

=== In classical fields ===
The charge conjugation symmetry is interpreted as that of electrical charge, because in all three cases (classical, quantum and geometry), one can construct Noether currents that resemble those of classical electrodynamics. This arises because electrodynamics itself, via Maxwell's equations, can be interpreted as a structure on a U(1) fiber bundle, the so-called circle bundle. This provides a geometric interpretation of electromagnetism: the electromagnetic potential $A_\mu$ is interpreted as the gauge connection (the Ehresmann connection) on the circle bundle. This geometric interpretation then allows (literally almost) anything possessing a complex-number-valued structure to be coupled to the electromagnetic field, provided that this coupling is done in a gauge-invariant way. Gauge symmetry, in this geometric setting, is a statement that, as one moves around on the circle, the coupled object must also transform in a "circular way", tracking in a corresponding fashion. More formally, one says that the equations must be gauge invariant under a change of local coordinate frames on the circle. For U(1), this is just the statement that the system is invariant under multiplication by a phase factor $e^{i\phi(x)}$ that depends on the (space-time) coordinate $x.$ In this geometric setting, charge conjugation can be understood as the discrete symmetry $z = (x + iy) \mapsto \overline z = (x - iy)$ that performs complex conjugation, that reverses the sense of direction around the circle.

=== In quantum theory ===
In quantum field theory, charge conjugation can be understood as the exchange of particles with anti-particles. To understand this statement, one must have a minimal understanding of what quantum field theory is. In (vastly) simplified terms, it is a technique for performing calculations to obtain solutions for a system of coupled differential equations via perturbation theory. A key ingredient to this process is the quantum field, one for each of the (free, uncoupled) differential equations in the system. A quantum field is conventionally written as

$$\psi(x) = \int d^3p \sum_{\sigma,n}
e^{-ip\cdot x} a\left(\vec p, \sigma, n\right) u\left(\vec p, \sigma, n\right) +
e^{ip\cdot x} a^\dagger\left(\vec p, \sigma, n\right) v\left(\vec p, \sigma, n\right)$$

where $\vec p$ is the momentum, $\sigma$ is a spin label, $n$ is an auxiliary label for other states in the system. The $a$ and $a^\dagger$ are creation and annihilation operators (ladder operators) and $u, v$ are solutions to the (free, non-interacting, uncoupled) differential equation in question. The quantum field plays a central role because, in general, it is not known how to obtain exact solutions to the system of coupled differential questions. However, via perturbation theory, approximate solutions can be constructed as combinations of the free-field solutions. To perform this construction, one has to be able to extract and work with any one given free-field solution, on-demand, when required. The quantum field provides exactly this: it enumerates all possible free-field solutions in a vector space such that any one of them can be singled out at any given time, via the creation and annihilation operators.

The creation and annihilation operators obey the canonical commutation relations, in that the one operator "undoes" what the other "creates". This implies that any given solution $u\left(\vec p, \sigma, n\right)$ must be paired with its "anti-solution" $v\left(\vec p, \sigma, n\right)$ so that one undoes or cancels out the other. The pairing is to be performed so that all symmetries are preserved. As one is generally interested in Lorentz invariance, the quantum field contains an integral over all possible Lorentz coordinate frames, written above as an integral over all possible momenta (it is an integral over the fiber of the frame bundle). The pairing requires that a given $u\left(\vec p\right)$ is associated with a $v\left(\vec p\right)$ of the opposite momentum and energy. The quantum field is also a sum over all possible spin states; the dual pairing again matching opposite spins. Likewise for any other quantum numbers, these are also paired as opposites. There is a technical difficulty in carrying out this dual pairing: one must describe what it means for some given solution $u$ to be "dual to" some other solution $v,$ and to describe it in such a way that it remains consistently dual when integrating over the fiber of the frame bundle, when integrating (summing) over the fiber that describes the spin, and when integrating (summing) over any other fibers that occur in the theory.

When the fiber to be integrated over is the U(1) fiber of electromagnetism, the dual pairing is such that the direction (orientation) on the fiber is reversed. When the fiber to be integrated over is the SU(3) fiber of the color charge, the dual pairing again reverses orientation. This "just works" for SU(3) because it has two dual fundamental representations $\mathbf{3}$ and $\overline\mathbf{3}$ which can be naturally paired. This prescription for a quantum field naturally generalizes to any situation where one can enumerate the continuous symmetries of the system, and define duals in a coherent, consistent fashion. The pairing ties together opposite charges in the fully abstract sense. In physics, a charge is associated with a generator of a continuous symmetry. Different charges are associated with different eigenspaces of the Casimir invariants of the universal enveloping algebra for those symmetries. This is the case for both the Lorentz symmetry of the underlying spacetime manifold, as well as the symmetries of any fibers in the fiber bundle posed above the spacetime manifold. Duality replaces the generator of the symmetry with minus the generator. Charge conjugation is thus associated with reflection along the line bundle or determinant bundle of the space of symmetries.

The above then is a sketch of the general idea of a quantum field in quantum field theory. The physical interpretation is that solutions $u\left(\vec p, \sigma, n\right)$ correspond to particles, and solutions $v\left(\vec p, \sigma, n\right)$ correspond to antiparticles, and so charge conjugation is a pairing of the two. This sketch also provides enough hints to indicate what charge conjugation might look like in a general geometric setting. There is no particular forced requirement to use perturbation theory, to construct quantum fields that will act as middle-men in a perturbative expansion. Charge conjugation can be given a general setting.

=== In geometry ===
For general Riemannian and pseudo-Riemannian manifolds, one has a tangent bundle, a cotangent bundle and a metric that ties the two together. There are several interesting things one can do, when presented with this situation. One is that the smooth structure allows differential equations to be posed on the manifold; the tangent and cotangent spaces provide enough structure to perform calculus on manifolds. Of key interest is the Laplacian, and, with a constant term, what amounts to the Klein–Gordon operator. Cotangent bundles, by their basic construction, are always symplectic manifolds. Symplectic manifolds have canonical coordinates $x,p$ interpreted as position and momentum, obeying canonical commutation relations. This provides the core infrastructure to extend duality, and thus charge conjugation, to this general setting.

A second interesting thing one can do is to construct a spin structure. Perhaps the most remarkable thing about this is that it is a very recognizable generalization to a $(p,q)$-dimensional pseudo-Riemannian manifold of the conventional physics concept of spinors living on a (1,3)-dimensional Minkowski spacetime. The construction passes through a complexified Clifford algebra to build a Clifford bundle and a spin manifold. At the end of this construction, one obtains a system that is remarkably familiar, if one is already acquainted with Dirac spinors and the Dirac equation. Several analogies pass through to this general case. First, the spinors are the Weyl spinors, and they come in complex-conjugate pairs. They are naturally anti-commuting (this follows from the Clifford algebra), which is exactly what one wants to make contact with the Pauli exclusion principle. Another is the existence of a chiral element, analogous to the gamma matrix $\gamma_5$ which sorts these spinors into left and right-handed subspaces. The complexification is a key ingredient, and it provides "electromagnetism" in this generalized setting. The spinor bundle doesn't "just" transform under the pseudo-orthogonal group $SO(p,q)$, the generalization of the Lorentz group $SO(1,3)$, but under a bigger group, the complexified spin group $\mathrm{Spin}^\mathbb{C}(p,q).$ It is bigger in that it is a double covering of $SO(p,q)\times U(1).$

The $U(1)$ piece can be identified with electromagnetism in several different ways. One way is that the Dirac operators on the spin manifold, when squared, contain a piece $F=dA$ with $A$ arising from that part of the connection associated with the $U(1)$ piece. This is entirely analogous to what happens when one squares the ordinary Dirac equation in ordinary Minkowski spacetime. A second hint is that this $U(1)$ piece is associated with the determinant bundle of the spin structure, effectively tying together the left and right-handed spinors through complex conjugation.

What remains is to work through the discrete symmetries of the above construction. There are several that appear to generalize P-symmetry and T-symmetry. Identifying the $p$ dimensions with time, and the $q$ dimensions with space, one can reverse the tangent vectors in the $p$ dimensional subspace to get time reversal, and flipping the direction of the $q$ dimensions corresponds to parity. The C-symmetry can be identified with the reflection on the line bundle. To tie all of these together into a knot, one finally has the concept of transposition, in that elements of the Clifford algebra can be written in reversed (transposed) order. The net result is that not only do the conventional physics ideas of fields pass over to the general Riemannian setting, but also the ideas of the discrete symmetries.

There are two ways to react to this. One is to treat it as an interesting curiosity. The other is to realize that, in low dimensions (in low-dimensional spacetime) there are many "accidental" isomorphisms between various Lie groups and other assorted structures. Being able to examine them in a general setting disentangles these relationships, exposing more clearly "where things come from".

== Charge conjugation for Dirac fields ==
The laws of electromagnetism (both classical and quantum) are invariant under the exchange of electrical charges with their negatives. For the case of electrons and quarks, both of which are fundamental particle fermion fields, the single-particle field excitations are described by the Dirac equation

$$(i{\partial\!\!\!\big /} - q{A\!\!\!\big /} - m) \psi = 0$$

One wishes to find a charge-conjugate solution

$$(i{\partial\!\!\!\big /} + q{A\!\!\!\big /} - m) \psi^c = 0$$

A handful of algebraic manipulations are sufficient to obtain the second from the first. Standard expositions of the Dirac equation demonstrate a conjugate field $\overline\psi = \psi^\dagger\gamma^0,$ interpreted as an anti-particle field, satisfying the complex-transposed Dirac equation

$$\overline\psi(-i{\partial\!\!\!\big /} - q{A\!\!\!\big /} - m) = 0$$

Note that some but not all of the signs have flipped. Transposing this back again gives almost the desired form, provided that one can find a 4×4 matrix $C$ that transposes the gamma matrices to insert the required sign-change:

$$C^{-1}\gamma_\mu C = -\gamma_\mu^\textsf{T}$$

The charge conjugate solution is then given by the involution

$$\psi \mapsto \psi^c=\eta_c\, C\overline\psi^\textsf{T}$$

The 4×4 matrix $C,$ called the charge conjugation matrix, has an explicit form given in the article on gamma matrices. Curiously, this form is not representation-independent, but depends on the specific matrix representation chosen for the gamma group (the subgroup of the Clifford algebra capturing the algebraic properties of the gamma matrices). This matrix is representation dependent due to a subtle interplay involving the complexification of the spin group describing the Lorentz covariance of charged particles. The complex number $\eta_c$ is an arbitrary phase factor $|\eta_c|=1,$ generally taken to be $\eta_c=1.$

=== Charge conjugation, chirality, helicity ===
The interplay between chirality and charge conjugation is a bit subtle, and requires articulation. It is often said that charge conjugation does not alter the chirality of particles. This is not the case for fields, the difference arising in the "hole theory" interpretation of particles, where an anti-particle is interpreted as the absence of a particle. This is articulated below.

Conventionally, $\gamma_5$ is used as the chirality operator. Under charge conjugation, it transforms as

$$C\gamma_5 C^{-1} = \gamma_5^\textsf{T}$$

and whether or not $\gamma_5^\textsf{T}$ equals $\gamma_5$ depends on the chosen representation for the gamma matrices. In the Dirac and chiral basis, one does have that $\gamma_5^\textsf{T} = \gamma_5$, while $\gamma_5^\textsf{T} = -\gamma_5$ is obtained in the Majorana basis. A worked example follows.

==== Weyl spinors ====
For the case of massless Dirac spinor fields, chirality is equal to helicity for the positive energy solutions (and minus the helicity for negative energy solutions). One obtains this by writing the massless Dirac equation as

$$i\partial\!\!\!\big /\psi = 0$$

Multiplying by $\gamma^5\gamma^0 = -i\gamma^1\gamma^2\gamma^3$ one obtains

$${\epsilon_{ij}}^m\sigma^{ij}\partial_m \psi = \gamma_5 \partial_t \psi$$

where $\sigma^{\mu\nu} = i\left[\gamma^\mu, \gamma^\nu\right]/2$ is the angular momentum operator and $\epsilon_{ijk}$ is the totally antisymmetric tensor. This can be brought to a slightly more recognizable form by defining the 3D spin operator $\Sigma^m\equiv {\epsilon_{ij}}^m\sigma^{ij},$ taking a plane-wave state $\psi(x) = e^{-ik\cdot x}\psi(k)$, applying the on-shell constraint that $k \cdot k = 0$ and normalizing the momentum to be a 3D unit vector: ${\hat k}_i = k_i/k_0$ to write

$$\left(\Sigma \cdot \hat k\right) \psi = \gamma_5 \psi~.$$

Examining the above, one concludes that angular momentum eigenstates (helicity eigenstates) correspond to eigenstates of the chiral operator. This allows the massless Dirac field to be cleanly split into a pair of Weyl spinors $\psi_\text{L}$ and $\psi_\text{R},$ each individually satisfying the Weyl equation, but with opposite energy:

$$\left(-p_0 + \sigma\cdot\vec p\right)\psi_\text{R} = 0$$

and

$$\left(p_0 + \sigma\cdot\vec p\right)\psi_\text{L} = 0$$

Note the freedom one has to equate negative helicity with negative energy, and thus the anti-particle with the particle of opposite helicity. To be clear, the $\sigma$ here are the Pauli matrices, and $p_\mu = i\partial_\mu$ is the momentum operator.

==== Charge conjugation in the chiral basis ====
Taking the Weyl representation of the gamma matrices, one may write a (now taken to be massive) Dirac spinor as

$$\psi = \begin{pmatrix} \psi_\text{L}\\ \psi_\text{R} \end{pmatrix}$$

The corresponding dual (anti-particle) field is

$$\overline{\psi}^\textsf{T}
= \left( \psi^\dagger \gamma^0 \right)^\textsf{T}
= \begin{pmatrix} 0 & I \\ I & 0\end{pmatrix} \begin{pmatrix} \psi_\text{L}^* \\ \psi_\text{R}^* \end{pmatrix}
= \begin{pmatrix} \psi_\text{R}^* \\ \psi_\text{L}^* \end{pmatrix}$$

The charge-conjugate spinors are

$$\psi^c
= \begin{pmatrix} \psi_\text{L}^c\\ \psi_\text{R}^c \end{pmatrix}
= \eta_c C \overline\psi^\textsf{T}
= \eta_c \begin{pmatrix} -i\sigma^2 & 0 \\ 0 & i\sigma^2\end{pmatrix} \begin{pmatrix} \psi_\text{R}^* \\ \psi_\text{L}^* \end{pmatrix}
= \eta_c \begin{pmatrix} -i\sigma^2\psi_\text{R}^* \\ i\sigma^2\psi_\text{L}^* \end{pmatrix}$$

where, as before, $\eta_c$ is a phase factor that can be taken to be $\eta_c=1.$ Note that the left and right states are inter-changed. This can be restored with a parity transformation. Under parity, the Dirac spinor transforms as

$$\psi\left(t, \vec x\right) \mapsto \psi^p\left(t, \vec x\right) = \gamma^0 \psi\left(t, -\vec x\right)$$

Under combined charge and parity, one then has

$$\psi\left(t, \vec x\right) \mapsto \psi^{cp}\left(t, \vec x\right)
=  \begin{pmatrix} \psi_\text{L}^{cp} \left(t, \vec x\right)\\ \psi_\text{R}^{cp}\left(t,\vec x\right) \end{pmatrix}
= \eta_c \begin{pmatrix} -i\sigma^2\psi_\text{L}^*\left(t, -\vec x\right) \\ i\sigma^2\psi_\text{R}^*\left(t, -\vec x\right) \end{pmatrix}$$

Conventionally, one takes $\eta_c = 1$ globally. See however, the note below.

==== Majorana condition ====
The Majorana condition imposes a constraint between the field and its charge conjugate, namely that they must be equal: $\psi = \psi^c.$ This is perhaps best stated as the requirement that the Majorana spinor must be an eigenstate of the charge conjugation involution.

Doing so requires some notational care. In many texts discussing charge conjugation, the involution $\psi\mapsto\psi^c$ is not given an explicit symbolic name, when applied to single-particle solutions of the Dirac equation. This is in contrast to the case when the quantized field is discussed, where a unitary operator $\mathcal{C}$ is defined (as done in a later section, below). For the present section, let the involution be named as $\mathsf{C}:\psi\mapsto\psi^c$ so that $\mathsf{C}\psi = \psi^c.$ Taking this to be a linear operator, one may consider its eigenstates. The Majorana condition singles out one such: $\mathsf{C}\psi = \psi.$ There are, however, two such eigenstates: $\mathsf{C}\psi^{(\pm)} = \pm \psi^{(\pm)}.$ Continuing in the Weyl basis, as above, these eigenstates are

$$\psi^{(+)} = \begin{pmatrix} \psi_\text{L}\\ i\sigma^2\psi_\text{L}^* \end{pmatrix}$$

and

$$\psi^{(-)} = \begin{pmatrix} i\sigma^2\psi_\text{R}^*\\ \psi_\text{R} \end{pmatrix}$$

The Majorana spinor is conventionally taken as just the positive eigenstate, namely $\psi^{(+)}.$ The chiral operator $\gamma_5$ exchanges these two, in that

$$\gamma_5\mathsf{C} = - \mathsf{C}\gamma_5$$

This is readily verified by direct substitution. Bear in mind that $\mathsf{C}$ does not have a 4×4 matrix representation! More precisely, there is no complex 4×4 matrix that can take a complex number to its complex conjugate; this inversion would require an 8×8 real matrix. The physical interpretation of complex conjugation as charge conjugation becomes clear when considering the complex conjugation of scalar fields, described in a subsequent section below.

The projectors onto the chiral eigenstates can be written as $P_\text{L} = \left(1 - \gamma_5\right)/2$ and $P_\text{R} = \left(1 + \gamma_5\right)/2,$ and so the above translates to

$$P_\text{L}\mathsf{C} = \mathsf{C}P_\text{R}~.$$

This directly demonstrates that charge conjugation, applied to single-particle complex-number-valued solutions of the Dirac equation flips the chirality of the solution. The projectors onto the charge conjugation eigenspaces are $P^{(+)} = (1 + \mathsf{C})P_\text{L}$ and $P^{(-)} = (1 - \mathsf{C})P_\text{R}.$

==== Geometric interpretation ====
The phase factor $\ \eta_c\$ can be given a geometric interpretation. It has been noted that, for massive Dirac spinors, the "arbitrary" phase factor $\ \eta_c\$ may depend on both the momentum, and the helicity (but not the chirality). This can be interpreted as saying that this phase may vary along the fiber of the spinor bundle, depending on the local choice of a coordinate frame. Put another way, a spinor field is a local section of the spinor bundle, and Lorentz boosts and rotations correspond to movements along the fibers of the corresponding frame bundle (again, just a choice of local coordinate frame). Examined in this way, this extra phase freedom can be interpreted as the phase arising from the electromagnetic field. For the Majorana spinors, the phase would be constrained to not vary under boosts and rotations.

=== Charge conjugation for quantized fields ===
The above describes charge conjugation for the single-particle solutions only. When the Dirac field is second-quantized, as in quantum field theory, the spinor and electromagnetic fields are described by operators. The charge conjugation involution then manifests as a unitary operator $\mathcal{C}$ (in calligraphic font) acting on the particle fields, expressed as

1. $\psi \mapsto \psi^c = \mathcal{C}\ \psi\ \mathcal{C}^\dagger = \eta_c\ C\ \overline\psi^\textsf{T}$
2. $\overline\psi \mapsto \overline\psi^c = \mathcal{C}\ \overline\psi\ \mathcal{C}^\dagger = \eta^*_c\ \psi^\textsf{T}\ C^{-1}$
3. $A_\mu \mapsto A^c_\mu = \mathcal{C}\ A_\mu\ \mathcal{C}^\dagger = -A_\mu\$

where the non-calligraphic $\ C\$ is the same 4×4 matrix given before.

=== Charge reversal in electroweak theory ===
Charge conjugation does not alter the chirality of particles. A left-handed neutrino would be taken by charge conjugation into a left-handed antineutrino, which does not interact in the Standard Model. This property is what is meant by the "maximal violation" of C-symmetry in the weak interaction.

Some postulated extensions of the Standard Model, like left-right models, restore this C-symmetry.

== Scalar fields ==
The Dirac field has a "hidden" $U(1)$ gauge freedom, allowing it to couple directly to the electromagnetic field without any further modifications to the Dirac equation or the field itself. (Note: This freedom is explicitly removed, constrained away in Majorana spinors.) This is not the case for scalar fields, which must be explicitly "complexified" to couple to electromagnetism. This is done by "tensoring in" an additional factor of the complex plane $\mathbb{C}$ into the field, or constructing a Cartesian product with $U(1)$.

One very conventional technique is simply to start with two real scalar fields, $\phi$ and $\chi$ and create a linear combination

$$\psi \mathrel\stackrel{\mathrm{def}}{=} {\phi + i\chi \over \sqrt{2}}$$

The charge conjugation involution is then the mapping $\mathsf{C}:i\mapsto -i$ since this is sufficient to reverse the sign on the electromagnetic potential (since this complex number is being used to couple to it). For real scalar fields, charge conjugation is just the identity map: $\mathsf{C}:\phi\mapsto \phi$ and $\mathsf{C}:\chi\mapsto \chi$ and so, for the complexified field, charge conjugation is just $\mathsf{C}:\psi\mapsto \psi^*.$ The "mapsto" arrow $\mapsto$ is convenient for tracking "what goes where"; the equivalent older notation is simply to write $\mathsf{C}\phi=\phi$ and $\mathsf{C}\chi = \chi$ and $\mathsf{C}\psi = \psi^*.$

The above describes the conventional construction of a charged scalar field. It is also possible to introduce additional algebraic structure into the fields in other ways. In particular, one may define a "real" field behaving as $\mathsf{C}:\phi\mapsto -\phi$. As it is real, it cannot couple to electromagnetism by itself, but, when complexified, would result in a charged field that transforms as $\mathsf{C}:\psi\mapsto -\psi^*.$ Because C-symmetry is a discrete symmetry, one has some freedom to play these kinds of algebraic games in the search for a theory that correctly models some given physical reality.

In physics literature, a transformation such as $\mathsf{C}:\phi \mapsto \phi^c = -\phi$ might be written without any further explanation. The formal mathematical interpretation of this is that the field $\phi$ is an element of $\mathbb{R}\times\mathbb{Z}_2$ where $\mathbb{Z}_2 = \{+1, -1\}.$ Thus, properly speaking, the field should be written as $\phi = (r, c)$ which behaves under charge conjugation as $\mathsf{C}: (r, c) \mapsto (r, -c).$ It is very tempting, but not quite formally correct to just multiply these out, to move around the location of this minus sign; this mostly "just works", but a failure to track it properly will lead to confusion.

== Combination of charge and parity reversal ==
It was believed for some time that C-symmetry could be combined with the parity-inversion transformation (see P-symmetry) to preserve a combined CP-symmetry. However, violations of this symmetry have been identified in the weak interactions (particularly in the kaons and B mesons). In the Standard Model, this CP violation is due to a single phase in the CKM matrix. If CP is combined with time reversal (T-symmetry), the resulting CPT-symmetry can be shown using only the Wightman axioms to be universally obeyed.

== In general settings ==
The analog of charge conjugation can be defined for higher-dimensional gamma matrices, with an explicit construction for Weyl spinors given in the article on Weyl–Brauer matrices. Note, however, spinors as defined abstractly in the representation theory of Clifford algebras are not fields; rather, they should be thought of as existing on a zero-dimensional spacetime.

The analog of T-symmetry follows from $\gamma^1\gamma^3$ as the T-conjugation operator for Dirac spinors. Spinors also have an inherent P-symmetry, obtained by reversing the direction of all of the basis vectors of the Clifford algebra from which the spinors are constructed. The relationship to the P and T symmetries for a fermion field on a spacetime manifold are a bit subtle, but can be roughly characterized as follows. When a spinor is constructed via a Clifford algebra, the construction requires a vector space on which to build. By convention, this vector space is the tangent space of the spacetime manifold at a given, fixed spacetime point (a single fiber in the tangent manifold). P and T operations applied to the spacetime manifold can then be understood as also flipping the coordinates of the tangent space as well; thus, the two are glued together. Flipping the parity or the direction of time in one also flips it in the other. This is a convention. One can become unglued by failing to propagate this connection.

This is done by taking the tangent space as a vector space, extending it to a tensor algebra, and then using an inner product on the vector space to define a Clifford algebra. Treating each such algebra as a fiber, one obtains a fiber bundle called the Clifford bundle. Under a change of basis of the tangent space, elements of the Clifford algebra transform according to the spin group. Building a principle fiber bundle with the spin group as the fiber results in a spin structure.

All that is missing in the above paragraphs are the spinors themselves. These require the "complexification" of the tangent manifold: tensoring it with the complex plane. Once this is done, the Weyl spinors can be constructed. These have the form

$$w_j = \frac{1}{\sqrt{2}}\left(e_{2j} - ie_{2j+1}\right)$$

where the $e_j$ are the basis vectors for the vector space $V=T_pM$, the tangent space at point $p\in M$ in the spacetime manifold $M.$ The Weyl spinors, together with their complex conjugates span the tangent space, in the sense that

$$V \otimes \mathbb{C} = W\oplus \overline W$$

The alternating algebra $\wedge W$ is called the spinor space, it is where the spinors live, as well as products of spinors (thus, objects with higher spin values, including vectors and tensors).

== See also ==
- C parity
- G-parity
- Anti-particle
- Antimatter
- Truly neutral particle
