= Fierz identity =

Identities involving spinor bilinears

In theoretical physics, a Fierz identity is an identity that allows one to rewrite bilinears of the product of two spinors as a linear combination of products of the bilinears of the individual spinors. It is named after Swiss physicist Markus Fierz. The Fierz identities are also sometimes called the Fierz–Pauli–Kofink identities, as Pauli and Kofink described a general mechanism for producing such identities.

There is a version of the Fierz identities for Dirac spinors and there is another version for Weyl spinors. And there are versions for other dimensions besides 3+1 dimensions. Spinor bilinears in arbitrary dimensions are elements of a Clifford algebra; the Fierz identities can be obtained by expressing the Clifford algebra as a quotient of the exterior algebra.

When working in 4 spacetime dimensions the bivector $\psi \bar{\chi}$ may be decomposed in terms of the Dirac matrices that span the space:

$$\psi \bar{\chi} = \frac{1}{4}( c_S \mathbb{1} + c_V^\mu \gamma_\mu + c_T^{\mu\nu} T_{\mu\nu} + c_A^\mu \gamma_\mu \gamma_5 + c_P \gamma_5 )$$.

The coefficients are

$$c_S = (\bar\chi \psi), \quad
c_V^\mu=(\bar\chi \gamma^\mu \psi), \quad
c_T^{\mu\nu}=-(\bar\chi T^{\mu\nu}\psi), \quad
c_A^\mu =-(\bar\chi \gamma^\mu \gamma_5\psi), \quad
c_P=(\bar\chi \gamma_5 \psi)$$

and are usually determined by using the orthogonality of the basis under the trace operation. By sandwiching the above decomposition between the desired gamma structures, the identities for the contraction of two Dirac bilinears of the same type can be written with coefficients according to the following table.

| Product | S | V | T | A | P |
|---|---|---|---|---|---|
| S × S = | 1/4 | 1/4 | −1/4 | −1/4 | 1/4 |
| V × V = | 1 | −1/2 | 0 | −1/2 | −1 |
| T × T = | −3/2 | 0 | −1/2 | 0 | −3/2 |
| A × A = | −1 | −1/2 | 0 | −1/2 | 1 |
| P × P = | 1/4 | −1/4 | −1/4 | 1/4 | 1/4 |

where

$$S=\bar\chi \psi, \quad
V=\bar\chi\gamma^\mu\psi, \quad
T= \bar\chi[\gamma^\mu, \gamma^\nu]\psi/2 \sqrt{2}, \quad
A= \bar\chi\gamma_5\gamma^\mu\psi, \quad
P= \bar\chi\gamma_5\psi .$$

The table is symmetric with respect to reflection across the central element. The signs in the table correspond to the case of commuting spinors, otherwise, as is the case of fermions in physics, all coefficients change signs.

For example, under the assumption of commuting spinors, the V × V product can be expanded as,

$$\left(\bar\chi\gamma^\mu\psi\right)\left(\bar\psi\gamma_\mu \chi\right)=
\left(\bar\chi\chi\right)\left(\bar\psi\psi\right)-
\frac{1}{2}\left(\bar\chi\gamma^\mu\chi\right)\left(\bar\psi\gamma_\mu\psi\right)-
\frac{1}{2}\left(\bar\chi\gamma^\mu\gamma_5\chi\right)\left(\bar\psi\gamma_\mu\gamma_5\psi\right)
-\left(\bar\chi\gamma_5\chi\right)\left(\bar\psi\gamma_5\psi\right)~.$$

Combinations of bilinears corresponding to the eigenvectors of the transpose matrix transform to the same combinations with eigenvalues ±1. For example, again for commuting spinors, V×V + A×A,

$$(\bar\chi\gamma^\mu\psi )(\bar\psi\gamma_\mu \chi )+     (\bar\chi\gamma_5\gamma^\mu\psi) (\bar\psi\gamma_5\gamma_\mu \chi)
=-( ~(\bar\chi\gamma^\mu\chi )(\bar\psi\gamma_\mu\psi)+
(\bar\chi\gamma_5\gamma^\mu\chi) (\bar\psi\gamma_5\gamma_\mu\psi  )~)~.$$

Simplifications arise when the spinors considered are Majorana spinors, or chiral fermions, as then some terms in the expansion can vanish from symmetry reasons. For example, for anticommuting spinors this time, it readily follows from the above that

$$\bar{\chi}_1 \gamma^\mu (1+\gamma_5)\psi_2 \bar{\psi}_3 \gamma_\mu (1-\gamma_5) \chi_4 = -2 \bar{\chi}_1 (1-\gamma_5)  \chi_4 \bar{\psi}_3 (1+\gamma_5) \psi_2   .$$
