= Feynman slash notation =

Notation for contractions with gamma matrices

In the study of Dirac fields in quantum field theory, Richard Feynman introduced the convenient Feynman slash notation (less commonly known as the Dirac slash notation). If A is a covariant vector (i.e., a 1-form),

$${A\!\!\!/} \ \stackrel{\mathrm{def}}{=}\ \gamma^0 A_0 + \gamma^1 A_1 + \gamma^2 A_2 + \gamma^3 A_3$$

where γ are the gamma matrices. Using the Einstein summation notation, the expression is simply

$${A\!\!\!/} \ \stackrel{\mathrm{def}}{=}\  \gamma^\mu A_\mu$$.

== Identities ==
Using the anticommutators of the gamma matrices, one can show that for any $a_\mu$ and $b_\mu$,

$$\begin{align}
{a\!\!\!/}{a\!\!\!/} =   a^\mu a_\mu \cdot I_4 = a^2 \cdot I_4 \\
{a\!\!\!/}{b\!\!\!/} + {b\!\!\!/}{a\!\!\!/} = 2 a \cdot b \cdot I_4.
\end{align}$$

where $I_4$ is the identity matrix in four dimensions.

In particular,

$${\partial\!\!\!/}^2 = \partial^2 \cdot I_4.$$

Further identities can be read off directly from the gamma matrix identities by replacing the metric tensor with inner products. For example,

$$\begin{align}
\gamma_\mu {a\!\!\!/} \gamma^\mu &= -2 {a\!\!\!/} \\
\gamma_\mu {a\!\!\!/} {b\!\!\!/} \gamma^\mu &= 4 a \cdot b \cdot I_4 \\
\gamma_\mu {a\!\!\!/} {b\!\!\!/} {c\!\!\!/} \gamma^\mu &= -2 {c\!\!\!/}{b\!\!\!/} {a\!\!\!/} \\
\gamma_\mu {a\!\!\!/} {b\!\!\!/} {c\!\!\!/}{d\!\!\!/} \gamma^\mu &= 2( {d\!\!\!/} {a\!\!\!/} {b\!\!\!/}{c\!\!\!/}+{c\!\!\!/} {b\!\!\!/} {a\!\!\!/}{d\!\!\!/}) \\
\operatorname{tr}({a\!\!\!/}{b\!\!\!/}) &= 4 a \cdot b \\
\operatorname{tr}({a\!\!\!/}{b\!\!\!/}{c\!\!\!/}{d\!\!\!/}) &= 4 \left[(a \cdot b)(c \cdot d) - (a \cdot c)(b \cdot d) + (a \cdot d)(b \cdot c) \right] \\
\operatorname{tr}({a\!\!\!/}{\gamma^\mu}{b\!\!\!/}{\gamma^\nu }) &=  4 \left[a^\mu b^\nu + a^\nu b^\mu - \eta^{\mu \nu}(a \cdot b) \right] \\
\operatorname{tr}(\gamma_5 {a\!\!\!/}{b\!\!\!/}{c\!\!\!/}{d\!\!\!/}) &=  4 i \varepsilon_{\mu \nu \lambda \sigma} a^\mu b^\nu c^\lambda d^\sigma \\
\operatorname{tr}({\gamma^\mu}{a\!\!\!/}{\gamma^\nu}) &= 0 \\
\operatorname{tr}({\gamma^5}{a\!\!\!/}{b\!\!\!/}) &=  0 \\
\operatorname{tr}({\gamma^0}({a\!\!\!/}+m){\gamma^0}({b\!\!\!/}+m)) &= 8a^0b^0-4(a \cdot b)+4m^2 \\
\operatorname{tr}(({a\!\!\!/}+m){\gamma^\mu}({b\!\!\!/}+m){\gamma^\nu}) &=
4 \left[a^\mu b^\nu+a^\nu b^\mu - \eta^{\mu \nu}((a \cdot b)-m^2) \right] \\
\operatorname{tr}({a\!\!\!/}_1...{a\!\!\!/}_{2n}) &=  \operatorname{tr}({a\!\!\!/}_{2n}...{a\!\!\!/}_1) \\
\operatorname{tr}({a\!\!\!/}_1...{a\!\!\!/}_{2n+1}) &= 0
\end{align}$$

where:

- $\varepsilon_{\mu \nu \lambda \sigma}$ is the Levi-Civita symbol
- $\eta^{\mu \nu}$ is the Minkowski metric
- $m$ is a scalar.

== With four-momentum ==
This section uses the (+ − − −) metric signature. Often, when using the Dirac equation and solving for cross sections, one finds the slash notation used on four-momentum: using the Dirac basis for the gamma matrices,

$$\gamma^0 = \begin{pmatrix} I & 0 \\ 0 & -I \end{pmatrix},\quad \gamma^i = \begin{pmatrix} 0 & \sigma^i \\ -\sigma^i & 0 \end{pmatrix} \,$$

as well as the definition of contravariant four-momentum in natural units,

$$p^\mu = \left(E, p_x, p_y, p_z \right) \,$$

we see explicitly that

$$\begin{align}
{p\!\!/} &= \gamma^\mu p_\mu = \gamma^0 p^0 - \gamma^i p^i \\
&= \begin{bmatrix} p^0 & 0 \\ 0 & -p^0 \end{bmatrix} - \begin{bmatrix} 0 & \sigma^i p^i \\ -\sigma^i p^i & 0 \end{bmatrix} \\
&= \begin{bmatrix} E & -\vec{\sigma} \cdot \vec{p} \\ \vec{\sigma} \cdot \vec{p} & -E \end{bmatrix}.
\end{align}$$

Similar results hold in other bases, such as the Weyl basis.

== See also ==
- Weyl basis
- Gamma matrices
- Four-vector
- S-matrix
