= Discrete symmetry =

Symmetry describing non-continuous changes in a system

In mathematics and geometry, a discrete symmetry is a symmetry that describes non-continuous changes in a system. For example, a square possesses discrete rotational symmetry, as only rotations by multiples of right angles will preserve the square's original appearance. Discrete symmetries sometimes involve some type of 'swapping', these swaps usually being called reflections or interchanges. In mathematics and theoretical physics, a discrete symmetry is a symmetry under the transformations of a discrete group—e.g. a topological group with a discrete topology whose elements form a finite or a countable set.

One of the most prominent discrete symmetries in physics is parity symmetry. It manifests itself in various elementary physical quantum systems, such as quantum harmonic oscillator, electron orbitals of Hydrogen-like atoms by forcing wavefunctions to be even or odd. This in turn gives rise to selection rules that determine which transition lines are visible in atomic absorption spectra.
