= Dirac matter =

Condensed matter system

The term Dirac matter refers to a class of condensed matter systems which can be effectively described by the Dirac equation. Even though the Dirac equation itself was formulated for fermions, the quasi-particles present within Dirac matter can be of any statistics. As a consequence, Dirac matter can be distinguished in fermionic, bosonic or anyonic Dirac matter. Prominent examples of Dirac matter are graphene and other Dirac semimetals, topological insulators, Weyl semimetals, various high-temperature superconductors with $d$-wave pairing and liquid helium-3. The effective theory of such systems is classified by a specific choice of the Dirac mass, the Dirac velocity, the gamma matrices and the space-time curvature. The universal treatment of the class of Dirac matter in terms of an effective theory leads to a common features with respect to the density of states, the heat capacity and impurity scattering.

== Definition ==
Members of the class of Dirac matter differ significantly in nature. However, all examples of Dirac matter are unified by similarities within the algebraic structure of an effective theory describing them.

=== General ===
The general definition of Dirac matter is a condensed matter system where the quasi-particle excitations can be described in curved spacetime by the generalised Dirac equation:

$$\left[i \hbar v_{\rm D} \gamma^a e_a^\mu d_\mu(p) - m v_{\rm D}^2\right]\Psi = 0.$$

In the above definition $d_\mu$ denotes a covariant vector depending on the $(d+1)$-dimensional momentum $p$ ($d$ space $+ 1$ time dimension), $e_a^\mu$ is the vierbein describing the curvature of the space, $m$ the quasi-particle mass and $v_{\rm D}$ the Dirac velocity. Note that since in Dirac matter the Dirac equation gives the effective theory of the quasiparticles, the energy from the mass term is $m v_{\rm D}^2$, not the rest mass $m c^2$ of a massive particle. $\gamma^\mu$ refers to a set of Dirac matrices, where the defining for the construction is given by the anticommutation relation,

$$\left\{\gamma^\mu,\gamma^\nu \right\} = \gamma^\mu\gamma^\nu + \gamma^\nu\gamma^\mu = \eta^{\mu\nu} I_d.$$

$\eta^{\mu\nu}$ is the Minkowski metric with signature (+ - - -) and $I_d$ is the $d\times d$-dimensional unit matrix. In all equations, implicit summation over $a$ and $\mu$ is used (Einstein convention). Furthermore, $\Psi$ is the wavefunction. The unifying feature of all Dirac matter is the matrix structure of the equation describing the quasi-particle excitations.

In the limit where $d_\mu(p) = D_\mu$, i.e. the covariant derivative, conventional Dirac matter is obtained. However, this general definition allows the description of matter with higher order dispersion relations and in curved spacetime as long as the effective Hamiltonian exhibits the matrix structure specific to the Dirac equation.

=== Common (conventional) ===
The majority of experimental realisations of Dirac matter to date are in the limit of $d_\mu (p) = D_\mu$ which therefore defines conventional Dirac matter in which the quasiparticles are described by the Dirac equation in curved space-time,

$$\left[i \hbar v_{\rm D} \gamma^a e_a^\mu D_\mu - m v_{\rm D}^2\right]\Psi = 0.$$

Here, $D_\mu$ denotes the covariant derivative. As an example, for the flat metric, the energy of a free Dirac particle differs significantly from the classical kinetic energy where energy is proportional to momentum squared:

$$\begin{align}
\mathrm{Free~Dirac~particle: \;} E &= \pm \sqrt{\hbar^2 v_{\rm D}^2\mathbf{k}^2+m^2c^4} \\
\mathrm{Kinetic\; energy: \;} E &= \frac{m |\mathbf{v}|^2}{2} = \frac{|\mathbf{k}|^2}{2m}.
\end{align}$$

The Dirac velocity $v_{\rm D}$ gives the gradient of the $E-k$ dispersion at large momenta $k$, $m$ is the mass of particle or object. In the case of massless Dirac matter, such as the fermionic quasiparticles in graphene or Weyl semimetals, the energy-momentum relation is linear,

$$E(\mathbf{k}) = \hbar v_{\rm D} |\mathbf{k}|$$

Therefore, conventional Dirac matter includes all systems that have a linear crossing or linear behavior in some region of the energy-momentum relation. They are characterised by features that resemble an 'X', sometimes tilted or skewed and sometimes with a gap between the upper $\vee$ and lower $\wedge$ parts (the turning points of which become rounded if the origin of the gap is a mass term).

The general features and some specific examples of conventional Dirac matter are discussed in the following sections.

== General properties of Dirac matter ==
=== Technological relevance and tuning of Dirac matter ===
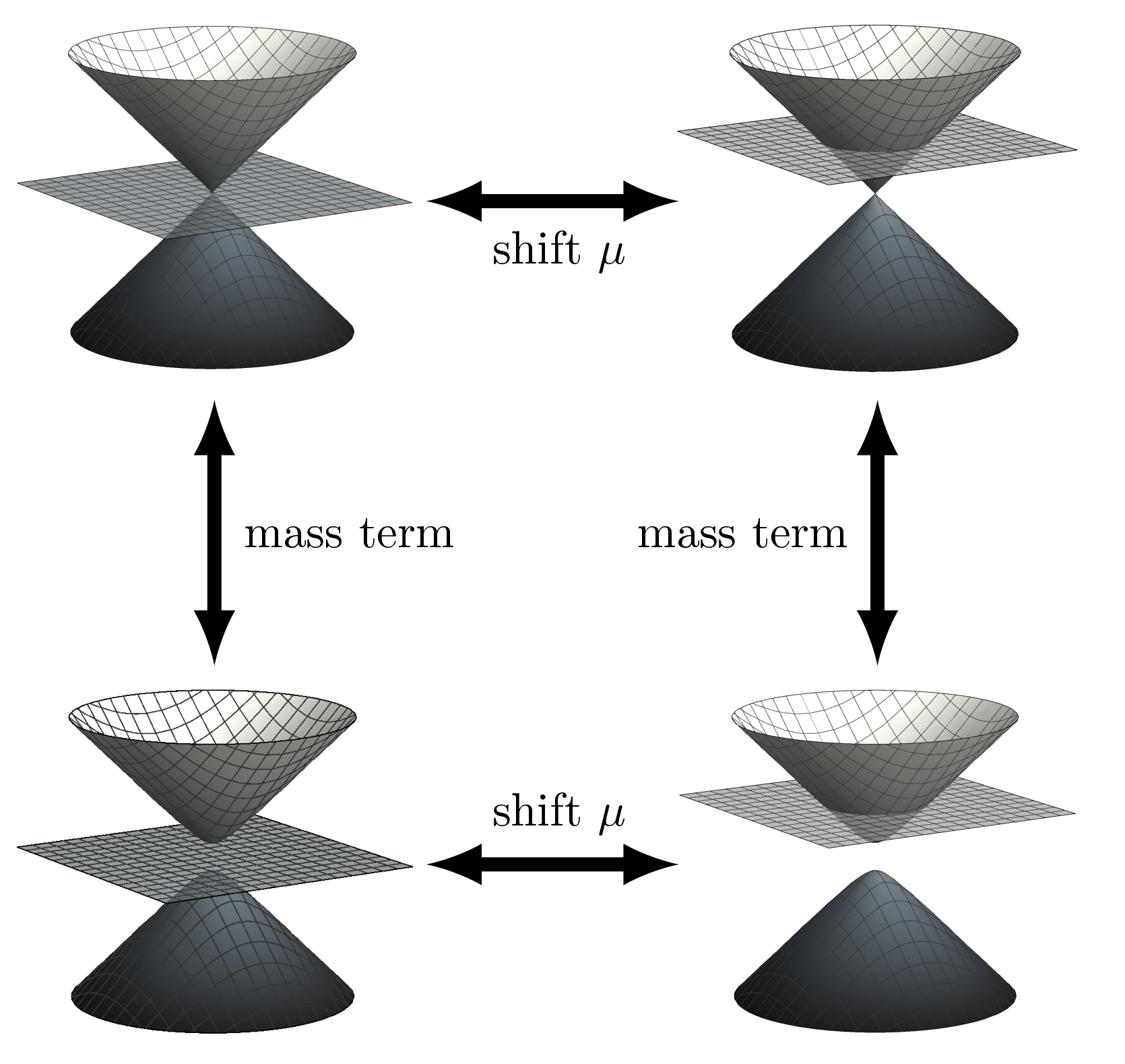
Tuning of Dirac matter: As the density of states is well defined, it can be nicely tuned at the Fermi level (for fermionic Dirac matter) by shifting the chemical potential $\mu$. Introducing a mass term $m$ leads to a gap between the two cones and the dispersion becomes quadratic near $k=0$.

Dirac matter, especially fermionic Dirac matter has much potential for technological applications. For example, 2010's Nobel Prize in Physics was awarded to Andre Geim and Konstantin Novoselov "for groundbreaking experiments regarding the material graphene". Within the official press release of the Swedish Royal Academy of Science it is stated that

[...] a vast variety of practical applications now appear possible including the creation of new materials and the manufacture of innovative electronics. Graphene transistors are predicted to be substantially faster than today's silicon transistors and result in more efficient computers.

— Swedish Royal Academy of Science

In general, the properties of massless fermionic Dirac matter can be controlled by shifting the chemical potential by means of doping or within a field effect setup. By tuning the chemical potential, it is possible to have a precise control of the number of states present, since the density of states varies in a well-defined way with energy.

Additionally, depending on the specific realization of the Dirac material, it may be possible to introduce a mass term $m$ that opens a gap in the spectrum - a band gap. In general, the mass term is the result of breaking a specific symmetry of the system. The size of the band gap can be controlled precisely by controlling the strength of the mass term.

=== Density of states ===
The density of states of $d$-dimensional Dirac matter near the Dirac point scales as $N(\epsilon)\propto |\epsilon|^{d-1}$ where $\epsilon$ is the particle energy. The vanishing density of states for quasiparticles in Dirac matter mimics semimetal physics for physical dimension $d>1$. In the two-dimensional systems such as graphene and topological insulators, the density of states gives a V shape, compared with the constant value for massive particles with dispersion $E=\hbar^2k^2/2m$.

Experimental measurement of the density of states near the Dirac point by standard techniques such as scanning tunnelling microscopy often differ from the theoretical form due to the effects of disorder and interactions.

=== Specific heat ===
Specific heat, the heat capacity per unit mass, describes the energy required to change the temperature of a sample. The low-temperature electronic specific heat of Dirac matter is $C(T\to 0)\sim T^d$ which is different from $C(T\to 0)\sim T$ encountered for normal metals. Therefore, for systems whose physical dimension is greater than 1, the specific heat can provide a clear signature of the underlying Dirac nature of the quasiparticles.

=== Landau quantization ===
Landau quantization refers to the quantization of the cyclotron orbits of charged particles in magnetic fields. As a result, the charged particles can only occupy orbits with discrete energy values, called Landau levels. For 2-dimensional systems with a perpendicular magnetic field, the energy for Landau-levels for ordinary matter described the Schrödinger equation and Dirac matter are given by

$$\begin{align}
\mathrm{Ordinary\;matter: \;} E &= \hbar \omega_c \left(n+\frac{1}{2} \right), \\
\mathrm{Dirac\;Matter: \;} E &= \hbar \omega_c \sqrt{|n|}.
\end{align}$$

Here, $\omega_c$ is the cyclotron frequency which is linearly dependent of the applied magnetic field and the charge of the particle. There are two distinct features between the Landau level quantization for 2D Schrödinger fermions (ordinary matter) and 2D Dirac fermions. First, the energy for Schrödinger fermions is linearly dependent with respect to the integer quantum number $n$, whereas it exhibits a square-root dependence for the Dirac fermions. This key difference plays an important role in the experimental verification of Dirac matter. Furthermore, for $n=0$ there exists a 0 energy level for Dirac fermions which is independent of the cyclotron frequency $\omega_c$ and with that of the applied magnetic field. For example, the existence of the zeroth Landau level gives rise to a quantum Hall effect where the Hall conductance in quantized at half-integer values.

== Fermionic Dirac matter ==
In the context of Fermionic quasiparticles, the Dirac velocity is identical to the Fermi velocity; in bosonic systems, no Fermi velocity exists, so the Dirac velocity is a more general property of such systems.

=== Graphene ===
Graphene is a 2-dimensional crystalline allotrope of carbon, where the carbon atoms are arranged in a honeycomb lattice. Each carbon atom forms $\sigma$-bonds to the three neighboring atoms that lie in the graphene plane at angles of 120$^\circ$. These bonds are mediated by three of carbon's four electrons while the fourth electron, which occupies a $\mathrm{p}_z$ orbital, mediates an out-of-plane π-bond that leads to the electronic bands at the Fermi level. The unique transport properties and the semimetallic state of graphene are the result of the delocalized electrons occupying these p_{z} orbitals.

The semimetallic state corresponds to a linear crossing of energy bands at the $K$ and $K'$ points of graphene's hexagonal Brillouin zone. At these two points, the electronic structure can be effectively described by the Hamiltonian

$${\cal H} = \hbar v_{\rm D} \left(\tau k_x \sigma_x + k_y \sigma_y \right).$$

Here, $\sigma_x$ and $\sigma_y$ are two of the three Pauli matrices. The factor $\tau=+/-$ indicates whether the Hamiltonian describes is centred on the $K$ or $K'$ valley at the corner of hexagonal Brillouin zone. For graphene, the Dirac velocity is about $\hbar v_{\rm D} \approx 5.8$ eV $\AA$. An energy gap in the dispersion of graphene can be obtained from a low-energy Hamiltonian of the form

$$\begin{align}
{\cal H} = \hbar v_{\rm D} (\tau k_x \sigma_x + k_y\sigma_y) + M \sigma_z,
\end{align}$$

which now contains a mass term $M$. There are several distinct ways of introducing a mass term, and the results have different characteristics. The most practical approach for creating a gap (introducing a mass term) is to break the sublattice symmetry of the lattice where each carbon atom is slightly different to its nearest but identical to its next-nearest neighbours; an effect that may result from substrate effects.

=== Topological insulators ===
A topological insulator is a material that behaves as an insulator in its interior (bulk) but whose surface contains conducting states. This property represents a non-trivial, symmetry protected topological order. As a consequence, electrons in topological insulators can only move along the surface of the material. In the bulk of a non-interacting topological insulator, the Fermi level is positioned within the gap between the conduction and valence bands. On the surface, there are special states within the bulk energy gap which can be effectively described by a Dirac Hamiltonian:

$$\begin{align}
{\cal H} = \hbar v_{\rm D} (\mathbf{k}\times \boldsymbol{\sigma})\cdot\hat{\mathbf{z}}
\end{align}$$

where $\hat{\mathbf{z}}$ is normal to the surface and ${\mathbf{\sigma}}$ is in the real spin basis. However, if we rotate spin by a unitary operator, $U={\rm diag}[1,i]$, we will end up with the standard notation of Dirac Hamiltonian, ${\cal H} = \hbar v_{\rm D} {\boldsymbol{\sigma}}\cdot {\mathbf{k}}$. Such Dirac cones emerging on the surface of 3-dimensional crystals were observed in experiment, e.g.: bismuth selenide (Bi$_2$Se$_3$), tin telluride (SnTe) and many other materials.

=== Transition metal dichalcogenides (TMDCs) ===
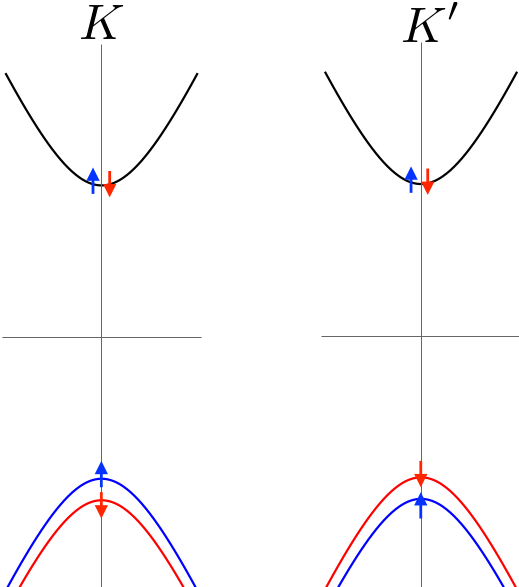
While they are gapped, near the $K$ and $K^\prime$ points of their hexagonal Brilliouin zone, the dispersions of transition metal dichalcogenides can be described by a massive Dirac equation with additional spin-orbit coupling terms that lead to spin-splitting in the valence band.

The low-energy properties some semiconducting transition metal dichalcogenide monolayers, can be described by a two-dimensional massive (gapped) Dirac Hamiltonian with an additional term describing a strong spin–orbit coupling:

$$\begin{align}
{\cal H} = \hbar v_{\rm D} (\tau k_x \sigma_x+k_y\sigma_y)+\Delta\sigma_z+\lambda(1-\sigma_z)\tau s+(\alpha+\beta\sigma_z)(k_x^2+k_y^2).
\end{align}$$

The spin-orbit coupling $\lambda$ provides a large spin-splitting in the valence band and $s$ indicates the spin degree of freedom. As for graphene, $\tau$ gives the valley degree of freedom - whether near the $K$ or $K^\prime$ point of the hexagonal Brillouin zone. Transition metal dichalcogenide monolayers are often discussed in reference to potential applications in valleytronics.

=== Weyl semimetals ===
Weyl semimetals, for example tantalum arsenide (TaAs) and related materials, strontium silicide (SrSi$_2$) have a Hamiltonian that is very similar to that of graphene, but now includes all three Pauli matrices and the linear crossings occur in 3D:

$${\cal H} = \hbar v_{\rm D} (k_x\sigma_x + k_y\sigma_y + k_z\sigma_z).$$

Since all three Pauli matrices are present, there is no further Pauli matrix that could open a gap in the spectrum and Weyl points are therefore topologically protected. Tilting of the linear cones so the Dirac velocity varies leads to type II Weyl semimetals. One distinct, experimentally observable feature of Weyl semimetals is that the surface states form Fermi arcs since the Fermi surface does not form a closed loop.

While the Weyl equation was originally derived for odd spatial dimensions, the generalization of a 3D Weyl fermion state in 2D leads to a distinct topological state of matter, labeled as 2D Weyl semimetals. 2D Weyl semimetals are spin-polarized analogues of graphene that promise access to topological properties of Weyl fermions in (2+1)-dim spacetime. In 2024, an intrinsic 2D Weyl semimetal with spin-polarized Weyl cones and topological Fermi strings (1D analog of Fermi arcs) was discovered in epitaxial monolayer bismuthene.

=== Dirac semimetals ===
In crystals that are symmetric under inversion and time reversal, electronic energy bands are two-fold degenerate. This degeneracy is referred to as Kramers degeneracy. Therefore, semimetals with linear crossings of two energy bands (two-fold degeneracy) at the Fermi energy exhibit a four-fold degeneracy at the crossing point. The effective Hamiltonian for these states can be written as

$${\cal H} = \hbar v_{\rm D} \left(
\begin{array}{cc}
\mathbf{k}\cdot\boldsymbol{\sigma} & 0 \\
0 & -\mathbf{k}\cdot\boldsymbol{\sigma}
\end{array}
\right).$$

This has exactly the matrix structure of Dirac matter. Examples of experimentally realised Dirac semimetals are sodium bismuthide (Na$_3$Bi) and cadmium arsenide (Cd$_3$As$_2$)

== Bosonic Dirac matter ==
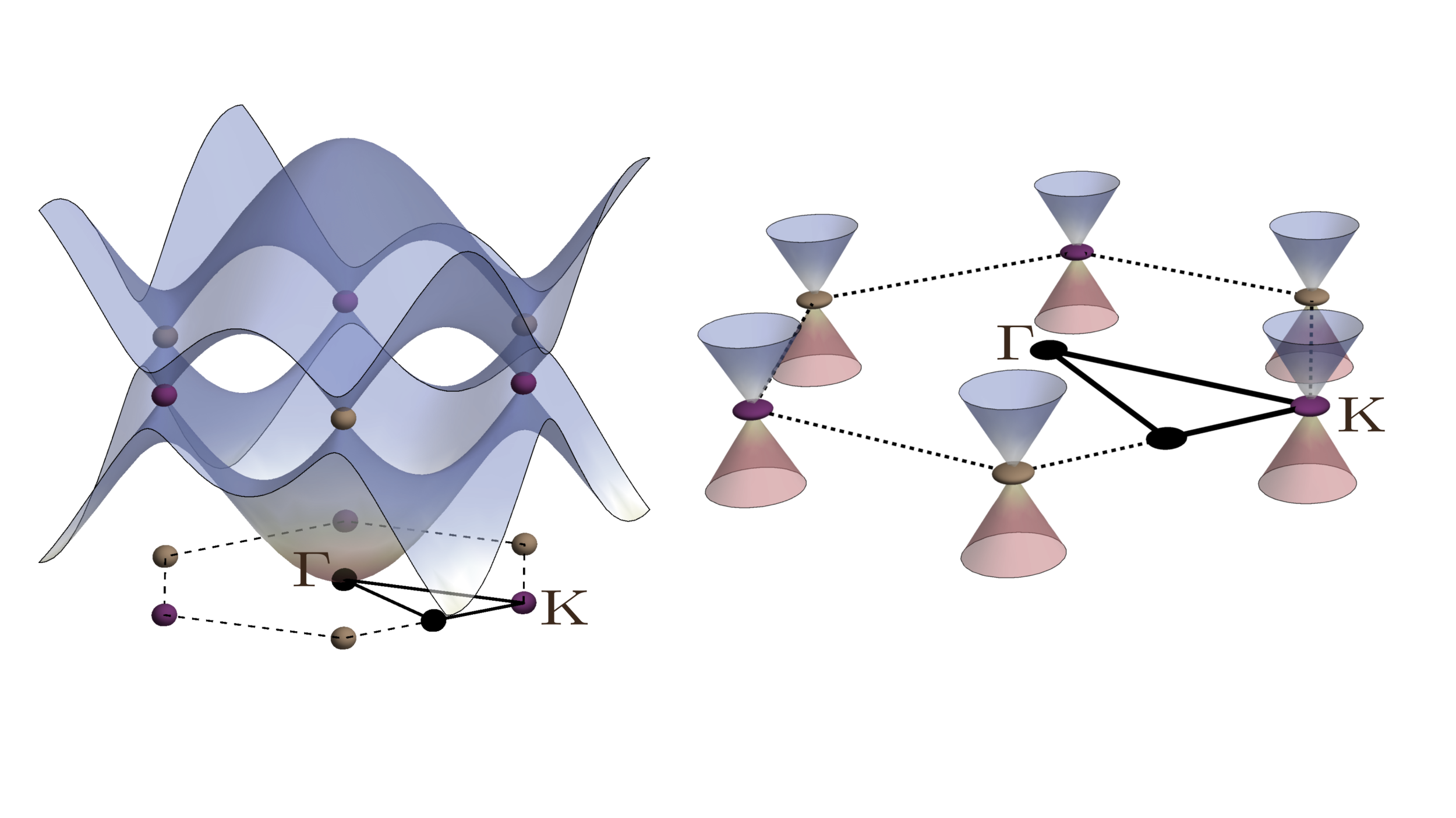
Dispersions for bosonic (left) and fermionic (right) Dirac materials. In contrast to the fermionic case where Pauli exclusion confines excitations close to the Fermi energy, the description of boson requires the entire Brillioun zone.

While historic interest focussed on fermionic quasiparticles that have potential for technological applications, particularly in electronics, the mathematical structure of the Dirac equation is not restricted to the statistics of the particles. This has led to recent development of the concept of bosonic Dirac matter.

In the case of bosons, there is no Pauli exclusion principle to confine excitations close to the chemical potential (Fermi energy for fermions) so the entire Brillouin zone must be included. At low temperatures, the bosons will collect at the lowest energy point, the $\Gamma$-point of the lower band. Energy must be added to excite the quasiparticles to the vicinity of the linear crossing point.

Several examples of Dirac matter with fermionic quasi-particles occur in systems where there is a hexagonal crystal lattice; so bosonic quasiparticles on an hexagonal lattice are the natural candidates for bosonic Dirac matter. In fact, the underlying symmetry of a crystal structure strongly constrains and protects the emergence of linear band crossings. Typical bosonic quasiparticles in condensed matter are magnons, phonons, polaritons and plasmons.

Existing examples of bosonic Dirac matter include transition metal halides such as CrX$_3$ (X= Cl, Br, I), where the magnon spectrum exhibits linear crossings, granular superconductors in a honeycomb lattice and hexagonal arrays of semiconductor microcavities hosting microcavity polaritons with linear crossings. Like graphene, all these systems have an hexagonal lattice structure.

== Anyonic Dirac materials ==
Anyonic Dirac matter is a hypothetical field which is rather unexplored to date. An anyon is a type of quasiparticle that can only occur in two-dimensional systems. Considering bosons and fermions, the interchange of two particles contributes a factor of 1 or -1 to the wave function. In contrast, the operation of exchanging two identical anyons causes a global phase shift. Anyons are generally classified as abelian or non-abelian, according to whether the elementary excitations of the theory transform under an abelian representation of the braid group or a non-abelian one. Abelian anyons have been detected in connection to the fractional quantum Hall effect. The possible construction of anyonic Dirac matter relies on the symmetry protection of crossings of anyonic energy bands. In comparison to bosons and fermions the situation gets more complicated as translations in space do not necessarily commute. Additionally, for given spatial symmetries, the group structure describing the anyon strongly depends on the specific phase of the anyon interchange. For example, for bosons, a rotation of a particle about 2π i.e., 360$^\circ$, will not change its wave function. For fermions, a rotation of a particle about 2π, will contribute a factor of $-1$ to its wave function, whereas a 4π rotation, i.e., a rotation about 720$^\circ$, will give the same wave function as before. For anyons, an even higher degree of rotation can be necessary, e.g., 6π, 8π, etc., to leave the wave function invariant.

== See also ==
- Dirac cone
