= Kagome metal =

Type of ferromagnetic quantum material

In solid-state physics, the kagome metal or kagome magnet is a type of ferromagnetic quantum material. The atomic lattice in a kagome magnet has layered overlapping triangles and large hexagonal voids, akin to the kagome pattern in traditional Japanese basket-weaving. This geometry induces a flat electronic band structure with Dirac crossings, in which the low-energy electron dynamics correlate strongly.

Electrons in a kagome metal experience a "three-dimensional cousin of the quantum Hall effect": magnetic effects require electrons to flow around the kagome triangles, akin to superconductivity. This phenomenon occurs in many materials at low temperatures and high external field, but, unlike superconductivity, materials are known in which the effect remains under standard conditions.

The first room-temperature, vanishing-external-field kagome magnet discovered was the intermetallic Fe_{3}Sn_{2}, as shown in 2011. Many others have since been found. Kagome magnets occur in a variety of crystal and magnetic structures, generally featuring a 3d-transition-metal kagome lattice with in-plane period ~5.5 Å. Examples include antiferromagnet Mn_{3}Sn, paramagnet CoSn, ferrimagnet TbMn_{6}Sn_{6}, hard ferromagnet (and Weyl semimetal) Co_{3}Sn_{2}S_{2}, and soft ferromagnet Fe_{3}Sn_{2}. Until 2019, all known kagome materials contained the heavy element tin, which has a strong spin–orbit coupling, but potential kagome materials under study (as of 2019) included magnetically doped Weyl-semimetal Co_{2}MnGa, and the class AV_{3}Sb_{5} (A = Cs, Rb, K). Although most research on kagome magnets has been performed on Fe_{3}Sn_{2}, it has since been discovered that FeSn in fact exhibits a structure much closer to the ideal kagome lattice.

A kagome lattice harbors massive Dirac fermions, Berry curvature, band gaps, and spin–orbit activity, all of which are conducive to the Hall Effect and zero-energy-loss electric currents. These behaviors are promising for the development of technologies in quantum computing, spin superconductors, and low power electronics. CsV_{3}Sb_{5} in particular exhibits numerous exotic properties, including superconductivity, topological states, and more. Magnetic skyrmionic bubbles have been found in Kagome metals over a wide temperature range. For example, they were observed in Fe_{3}Sn_{2} at ~200-600 K using LTEM but with high critical field ~0.8 T.

== See also ==
- Herbertsmithite, a natural kagome magnet
- Magnon – Spin 1 quasiparticle; quantum of a spin wave
