= Arsenide =

Anion

In chemistry, an arsenide is a compound of arsenic with a less electronegative element or elements. Many metals form binary compounds containing arsenic, and these are called arsenides. They exist with many stoichiometries, and in this respect arsenides are similar to phosphides.

== Alkali metal and alkaline earth arsenides ==
The group 1 alkali metals and the group 2, alkaline earth metals, form arsenides with isolated arsenic atoms. They form upon heating arsenic powder with excess sodium gives sodium arsenide (Na_{3}As). The structure of Na_{3}As is complex with unusually short Na–Na distances of 328–330 pm which are shorter than in sodium metal. This short distance indicates the complex bonding in these simple phases, i.e. they are not simply salts of As^{3−} anion, for example. The compound LiAs, has a metallic lustre and electrical conductivity indicating some metallic bonding. These compounds are mainly of academic interest. For example, "sodium arsenide" is a structural motif adopted by many compounds with the A_{3}B stoichiometry.

Indicative of their salt-like properties, hydrolysis of alkali metal arsenides gives arsine:

Na_{3}As + 3 H_{2}O → AsH_{3} + 3 NaOH

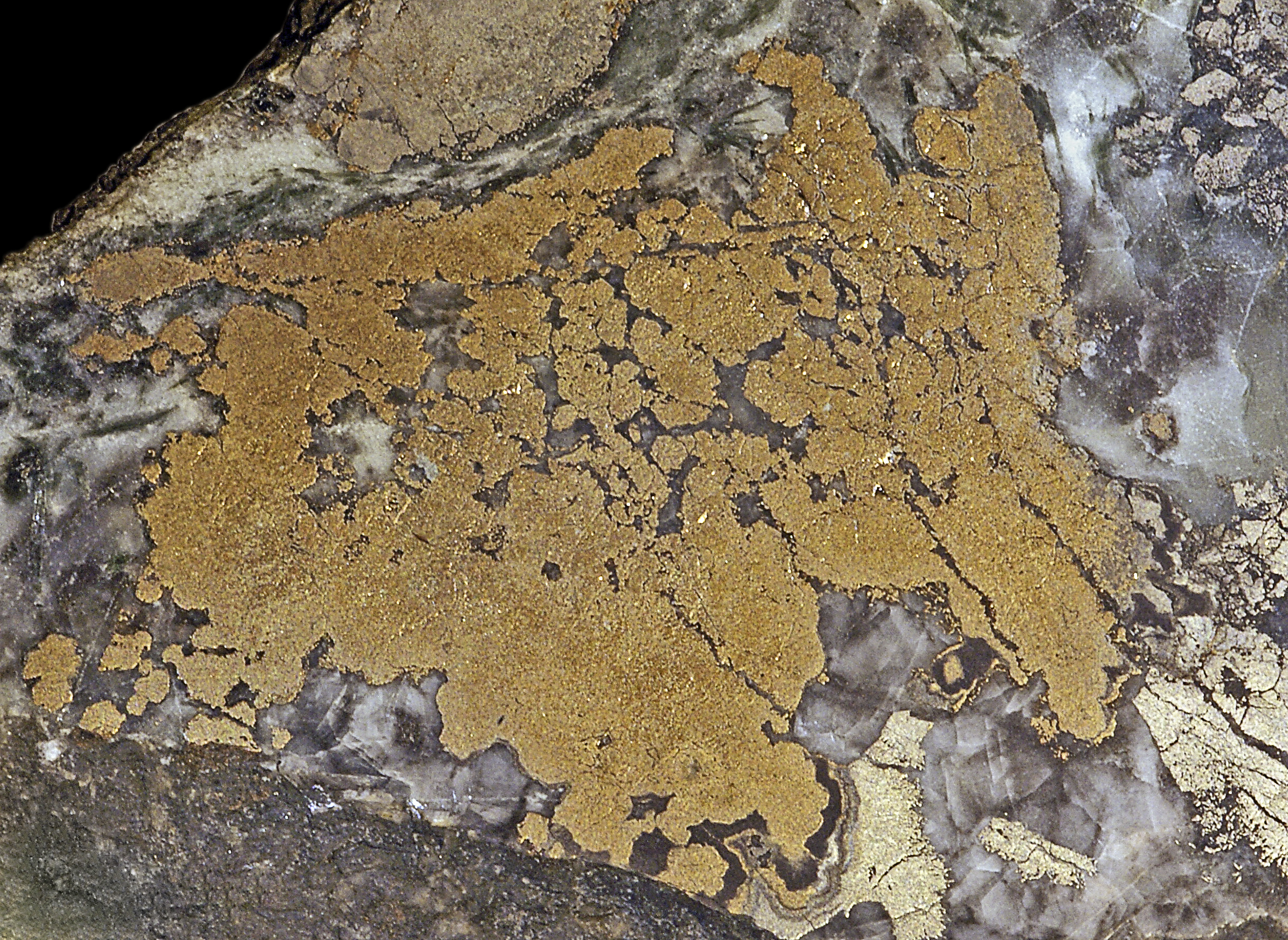
Nickel arsenide is a common impurity in ores of nickel. It is also a prototype of a class of structures.

== III–V compounds ==
Many arsenides of the group 13 elements (group III) are valuable semiconductors. Gallium arsenide (GaAs) features isolated arsenic centers with a zincblende structure (wurtzite structure can eventually also form in nanostructures), and with predominantly covalent bonding – it is a III–V semiconductor.

== II–V compounds ==
Arsenides of the group 12 elements (group II) are also noteworthy. Cadmium arsenide (Cd_{3}As_{2}) was shown to be a three-dimensional (3D) topological Dirac semimetal analogous to graphene. Cd_{3}As_{2}, Zn_{3}As_{2} and other compounds of the Zn-Cd-P-As quaternary system have very similar crystalline structures, which can be considered distorted mixtures of the zincblende and antifluorite crystalline structures.

== Polyarsenides ==
=== Transition metal arsenides ===
Arsenic anionics are known to catenate, that is, form chains, rings, and cages. The mineral skutterudite (CoAs_{3}) features rings that are usually described as As^{4−}_{4}. Assigning formal oxidation numbers is difficult because these materials are highly covalent and often are best described with band theory. Sperrylite (PtAs_{2}) is usually described as Pt^{4+}As^{4−}_{2}. The arsenides of the transition metals are mainly of interest because they contaminate sulfidic ores of commercial interest. The extraction of the metals – nickel, iron, cobalt, copper – entails chemical processes such as smelting that poses environmental risks. In the mineral, arsenic is immobile and poses no environmental risk. Released from the mineral, arsenic is poisonous and mobile.

=== Zintl phases ===
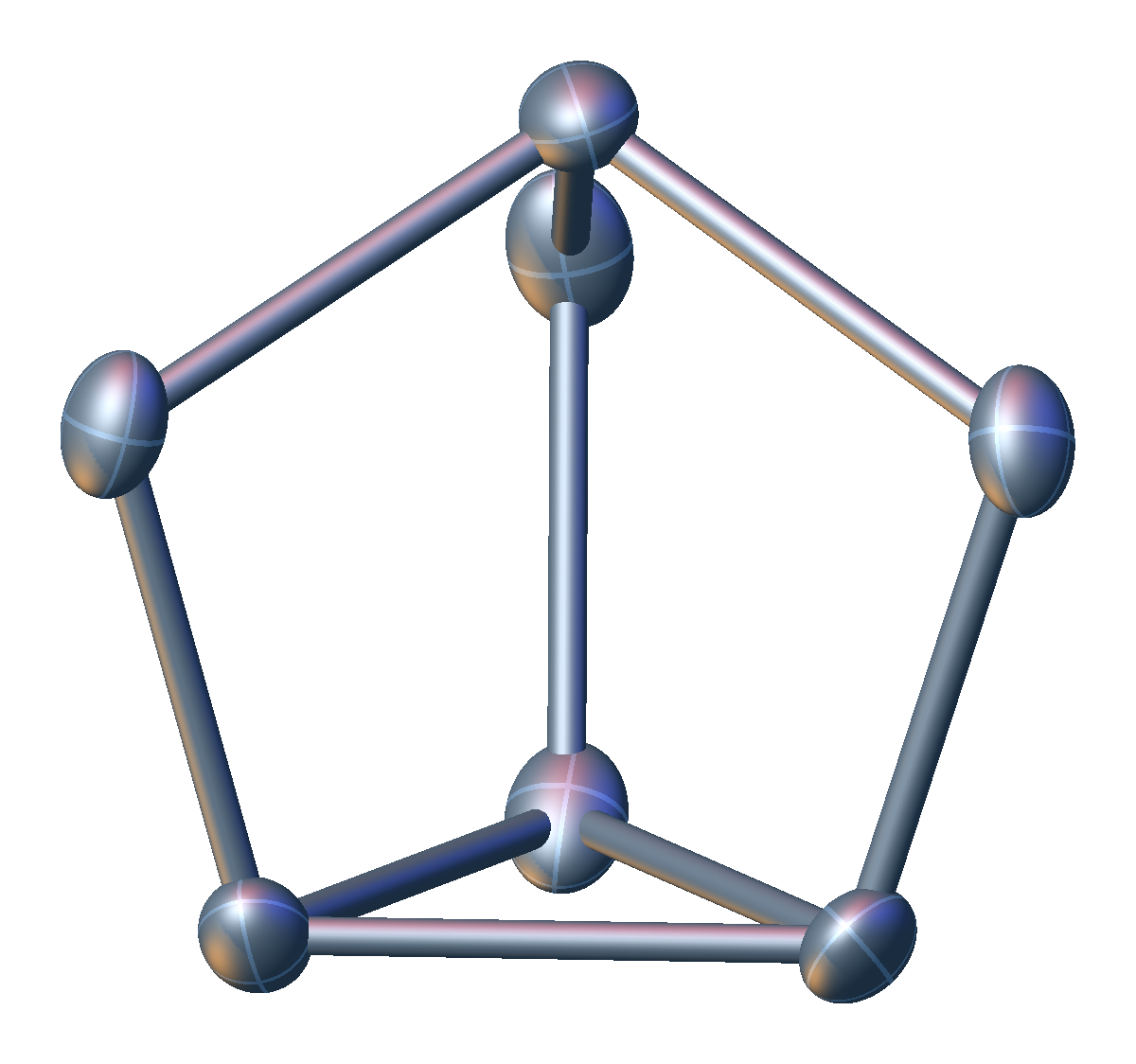
Structure of [As_{7}]^{3−} subunit in the Zintl phase Cs_{2}NaAs_{7}.

Partial reduction of arsenic with alkali metals (and related electropositive elements) affords polyarsenic compounds, which are members of the Zintl phases.

== See also ==
- See Category:Arsenides for a list.
