= Triiron ditin intermetallic =

Identifiers
CAS Number	12382-38-6
3D model (JSmol)	Interactive image
PubChem CID	71354756
CompTox Dashboard (EPA)	DTXSID10779215
- InChI: InChI=1S/3Fe.2Sn Key: CQCUKVSIWYDQMI-UHFFFAOYSA-N
- SMILES: [Fe].[Fe].[Fe].[Sn].[Sn]

Properties
Chemical formula	Fe_{3}Sn·Sn

Structure
Crystal structure	Kagome
Space group	R3̅m
Lattice constant	a = 5.338 Å, c = 19.789 Å hexagonal

Related compounds
Related compounds	Fe_{3}Sn
- Except where otherwise noted, data are given for materials in their standard state (at 25 °C [77 °F], 100 kPa). Infobox references

The compound with empirical formula Fe_{3}Sn_{2} is the first known kagome magnet. It is an intermetallic compound composed of iron (Fe) and tin (Sn), with alternating planes of Fe_{3}Sn and Sn.

== Preparation ==
The iron-tin intermetallic forms at around 750 °C (1,380 °F) and naturally assumes a kagome structure. Quenching in an ice bath then cools the material to room temperature without disrupting the atomic structure.

== Electronic structure ==
The compound's band structure exhibits a double Dirac cone, enabling Dirac fermions. A 30 meV gap separates the cones, which indicates the quantum Hall effect and massive Dirac fermions. Close measurement of the Fermi surface via the de Haas-van Alphen effect suggests that the massive fermions also exhibit Kane-Mele-type spin-orbit coupling.

Fe_{3}Sn_{2} can also host magnetic skyrmions, but these typically require high magnetic fields to nucleate. For samples with a small (but nonzero) thickness gradient, only a small-amplitude (5-10 mT), direction-variant magnetic field suffices to nucleate the quasiparticles.
