= Semi-Dirac fermion =

Class of fermionic quasiparticles

In condensed matter physics, semi-Dirac fermions are a class of quasiparticles that can exhibit both massless (like light) and massive (like conventional particles) behavior depending on the direction of propagation. More precisely, they disperse linearly along a given direction in momentum space, and quadratically in the orthogonal direction. This exotic electronic structure can emerge at the critical point of a topological phase transition from semimetal to insulator wherein two Dirac cones coalesce, giving rise to a semi-Dirac point. Note that the Berry phases annihilate, resulting in topologically trivial quasiparticles. The fundamental anisotropy leads to a variety of unique properties and novel phenomena. These excitations have been experimentally observed in a wide range of physical contexts from cold atoms trapped in optical lattices, to the nodal line semi-metal zirconium silicon sulfide (ZrSiS), which is the first unambiguous detection in solids. Different approaches have been taken to generalizations, such as considering arbitrary numbers of quadratically and linearly dispersing dimensions, or replacing the quadratic term with an arbitrary even power law. For the latter, an interacting microscopic model has been proposed as the first theoretical realization of the higher-order quartic semi-Dirac fermions in two-dimensions.

There are also type-II semi-Dirac fermions, which were proposed as a model to explain the coexisting non-trivial topological, and semi-Dirac, behavior in titanium/vanadium oxide heterostructures. These excitations occur at the merger of three Dirac cones, leaving a finite Berry phase and the associated topological properties. The critical spectrum possesses semi-Dirac character in the sense that it is linear and parabolic along the principal axes, but displays a different admixture of momentum components for an arbitrary direction of motion. Moreover the system remains semimetallic following the transition, with both Dirac and type-II semi-Dirac properties appearing at different Fermi levels. Long-range Coulomb interactions have been shown to drive the system to this electronic phase.

== See also ==
- Dirac fermion
