= Palladium diarsenide =

Identifiers
CAS Number	12255-86-6
3D model (JSmol)	Interactive image
- InChI: InChI=1S/2As.Pd
- SMILES: [Pd].[As].[As]

Properties
Chemical formula	PdAs_{2}
Molar mass	256.26g/mol
Density	7.9g·cm^{−3}
- Except where otherwise noted, data are given for materials in their standard state (at 25 °C [77 °F], 100 kPa). Infobox references

Palladium diarsenide is an inorganic compound with the chemical formula PdAs_{2}. It is one of the arsenides of palladium.

== Preparation ==
Palladium diarsenide can be obtained by the reaction of palladium and arsenic:

Pd + 2 As → PdAs_{2}

In the reaction of palladium and gallium arsenide (350~800°C), palladium disarsenide will also be formed:

3 Pd + 2 GaAs → 2 PdGa + PdAs_{2}

It is a cubic crystal with a = 5.983 Å.
