= Zirconium silicon sulfide =

Layered Dirac semi-metal with the chemical formula ZrSiS

Identifiers
3D model (JSmol)	Interactive image
- InChI: InChI=1S/H2S.H4Si.Zr/h1H2;1H4; Key: DQZDVZPUPSFVHT-UHFFFAOYSA-N
- SMILES: [Zr].[Si].[S]

Properties
Chemical formula	SSiZr
Molar mass	151.37 g·mol^{−1}
Appearance	black

Structure
Crystal structure	tetragonal
Space group	P4/nmm
Lattice constant	a = 3.5440 Å, c = 8.0550 Å
Lattice volume (V)	101.17 Å^{3}
- Except where otherwise noted, data are given for materials in their standard state (at 25 °C [77 °F], 100 kPa). Infobox references

Zirconium silicon sulfide (ZrSiS) is a crystalline layered Dirac semi-metal compound of zirconium, silicon and sulfur. Its crystals are made from planes of five single-atom layers of each element in the order S-Zr-Si-Zr-S, with the single element planes connected to their neighbors by van der Waals forces.

Semi-Dirac fermions were first observed within ZrSiS.
