= Pseudogap =

State at which a Fermi surface has a partial energy gap in condensed matter physics

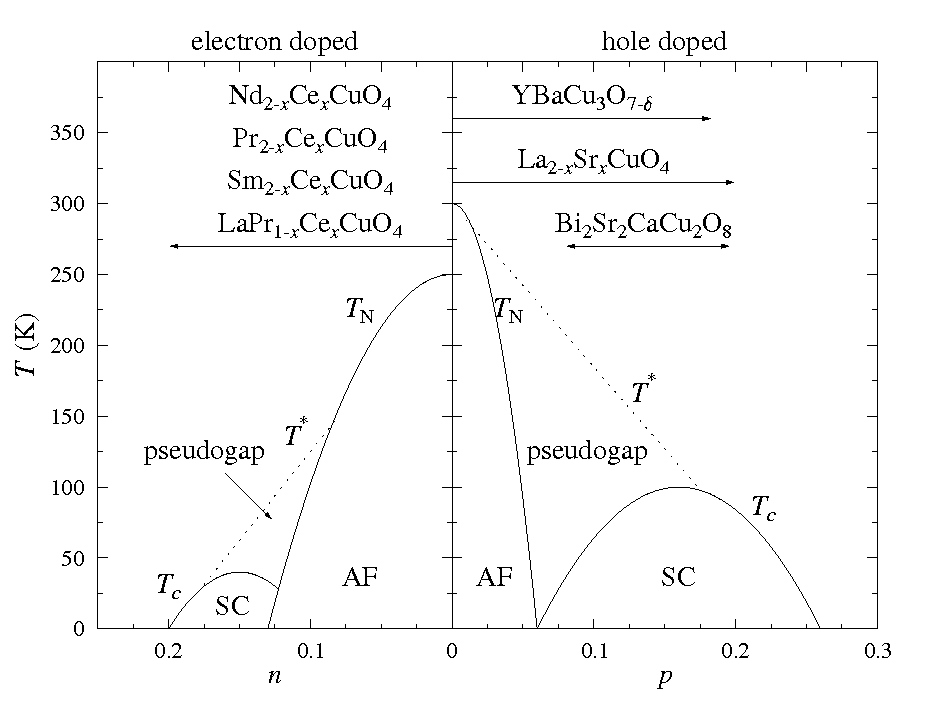
Phase diagram for a doped cuprate superconductor showing the pseudogap phase

In condensed matter physics, a pseudogap describes a state where the Fermi surface of a material possesses a partial energy gap, for example, a band structure state where the Fermi surface is gapped only at certain points.

The term pseudogap was coined by Nevill Mott in 1968 to indicate a minimum in the density of states at the Fermi level, N(E_{F}), resulting from Coulomb repulsion between electrons in the same atom, a band gap in a disordered material or a combination of these.

In the modern context pseudogap is a term from the field of high-temperature superconductivity which refers to an energy range (normally near the Fermi level) which has very few states associated with it. This is very similar to a true 'gap', which is an energy range that contains no allowed states. Such gaps open up, for example, when electrons interact with the lattice. The pseudogap phenomenon is observed in a region of the phase diagram generic to cuprate high-temperature superconductors, existing in underdoped specimens at temperatures above the superconducting transition temperature.

Only certain electrons 'see' this gap. The gap, which should be associated with an insulating state, only exists for electrons traveling parallel to the copper-oxygen bonds. Electrons traveling at 45° to this bond can move freely throughout the crystal. The Fermi surface therefore consists of Fermi arcs forming pockets centered on the corner of the Brillouin zone. In the pseudogap phase these arcs gradually disappear as the temperature is lowered until only four points on the diagonals of the Brillouin zone remain ungapped.

On one hand, this could indicate a completely new electronic phase which consumes available states, leaving only a few to pair up and superconduct. On the other hand, the similarity between this partial gap and that in the superconducting state could indicate that the pseudogap results from preformed Cooper pairs.

Recently a pseudogap state has also been reported in strongly disordered conventional superconductors such as TiN, NbN, or granular aluminum.

== Experimental evidence ==
A pseudogap can be seen with several different experimental methods. One of the first observations was in NMR measurements of YBa_{2}Cu_{3}O_{6+x} by H. Alloul et al. and by specific heat measurements by Loram et al. The pseudogap is also apparent in ARPES (Angle Resolved Photoemission Spectroscopy) and STM (Scanning tunneling microscope) data, which can measure the density of states of the electrons in a material.

== Mechanism ==
The origin of the pseudogap is controversial and still subject to debate in the condensed matter community. Two main interpretations are emerging:

1. The scenario of preformed pairs In this scenario, electrons form pairs at a temperature T* that can be much larger than the critical temperature T_{c} where superconductivity appears. Values of T* of the order of 300 K have been measured in underdoped cuprates where T_{c} is about 80 K.

The superconductivity does not appear at T* because large phase fluctuations of the pairing field cannot order at this temperature. The pseudogap is then produced by incoherent fluctuations of the pairing field. The pseudogap is a normal state precursor of the superconducting gap due to local, dynamic pairing correlations. This point of view is supported by a quantitative approach of the attractive pairing model to specific heat experiments.

2. The scenario of a non-superconductivity-related pseudogap In this class of scenarios, many different possible origins have been put forward, such as the formation of electronic stripes, antiferromagnetic ordering, or other exotic order parameters competing with superconductivity.
