= Cadmium phosphide =

Chemical compound of cadmium and phosphorus

Names
- Other names Tricadmium diphosphide

Identifiers
CAS Number	12014-28-7
3D model (JSmol)	Interactive image
ChemSpider	140173
ECHA InfoCard	100.031.437
EC Number	234-595-5
PubChem CID	159393
CompTox Dashboard (EPA)	DTXSID401010274
- InChI: InChI=1S/3Cd. 2P/q3*+2;2*-3 Key: BYWFNUBYQJKAKF-UHFFFAOYSA-N
- SMILES: [Cd+2].[Cd+2].[Cd+2].[P-3].[P-3]

Properties
Chemical formula	Cd_{3}P_{2}
Molar mass	399.178 g/mol
Appearance	bluish white or gray
Density	5.96 g/cm^{3}
Melting point	700 °C (1,292 °F; 973 K)
Electron mobility	1500 cm^{2}/Vs
Refractive index (n_{D})	3.88

Structure
Crystal structure	Tetragonal

Hazards
- GHS labelling
Pictograms	(GHS07: Exclamation mark) (GHS08: Health hazard) (GHS09: Environmental hazard)
Signal word	Warning
Hazard statements	H302, H312, H314, H332, H350, H370, H410
Precautionary statements	P201, P202, P210, P233, P261, P264, P270, P271, P273, P280, P301+P312, P302+P352, P304+P340, P308+P313, P312, P330, P362+P364, P391, P405, P501
- Except where otherwise noted, data are given for materials in their standard state (at 25 °C [77 °F], 100 kPa). Infobox references

Cadmium phosphide (Cd_{3}P_{2}) is an inorganic chemical compound. It is a grey or white bluish solid semiconductor material with a bandgap of 0.5 eV. It has applications as a pesticide, material for laser diodes and for high-power-high-frequency electronics.

== Synthesis and reactions ==
Cadmium phosphide can be prepared by the reaction of cadmium with phosphorus:

6 Cd + P_{4} → 2 Cd_{3}P_{2}

== Structure ==
Cd_{3}P_{2} has a room-temperature tetragonal form.

The crystalline structure of cadmium phosphide is very similar to that of zinc phosphide (Zn_{3}P_{2}), cadmium arsenide (Cd_{3}As_{2}) and zinc arsenide (Zn_{3}As_{2}). These compounds of the Zn-Cd-P-As quaternary system exhibit full continuous solid-solution.

== Applications ==
Over the last decade, interest in cadmium phosphide as a source for fast, near-IR emission has grown due to the development of cadmium phosphide quantum dots. Literature has demonstrated that these quantum dots possess tunable emission between 700 nm to 1500 nm. A recent paper investigated the effect of surface passivation on these quantum dots and showed that cadmium phosphide quantum dots may have an intrinsic band-edge relaxation time less than 100 ns.

== Safety ==
Like other metal phosphides, it is acutely toxic when swallowed due to the formation of phosphine gas when it reacts with gastric acid. It is also carcinogenic and dangerous for the skin, eyes and other organs in a large part due to cadmium poisoning.
