= Zinc diphosphide =

Compound of zinc and phosphorus

Identifiers
CAS Number	12037-79-5
3D model (JSmol)	Interactive image
ChemSpider	141421
EC Number	234-867-3
- InChI: InChI=1S/P2.Zn/c1-2;/q-2;+2 Key: WHCVAYNMVBDLCU-UHFFFAOYSA-N
- SMILES: [P-]=[P-].[Zn+2]

Properties
Chemical formula	ZnP_{2}
Molar mass	127.33 g/mol
Appearance	red crystals
Density	3.53 g/cm^{3}
Melting point	1,040 °C (1,900 °F; 1,310 K)

Structure
Crystal structure	Tetragonal, tP24
Space group	P4_{1}2_{1}2, No. 92

Hazards
- GHS labelling
Pictograms	(GHS02: Flammable) (GHS06: Toxic)
Signal word	Danger
- Except where otherwise noted, data are given for materials in their standard state (at 25 °C [77 °F], 100 kPa). Infobox references

Zinc diphosphide (ZnP_{2}) is an inorganic chemical compound. It is a red semiconductor solid with a band gap of 2.1 eV. It is one of the two compounds in the zinc-phosphorus system, the other being zinc phosphide (Zn_{3}P_{2}).

== Synthesis and reactions ==
Zinc diphosphide can be prepared by the reaction of zinc with phosphorus.

2 Zn + P_{4} → 2 ZnP_{2}

== Structure ==
ZnP_{2} has a room-temperature tetragonal form that converts to a monoclinic form at around 990 °C. In both of these forms, there are chains of P atoms, helical in the tetragonal, semi-spiral in the monoclinic.

This compound is part of the Zn-Cd-P-As quaternary system and exhibit partial solid-solution with other binary compounds of the system.

== Safety ==
ZnP_{2}, like Zn_{3}P_{2}, is highly toxic due to the release of phosphine gas when the material reacts with gastric acid.
