= Zinc phosphide =

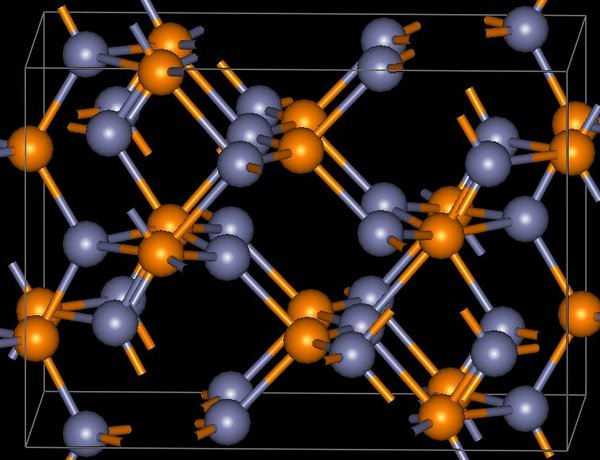
- Zinc phosphide

Names
- Other names trizinc diphosphide

Identifiers
CAS Number	1314-84-7 (Zn_{3}P_{2}); 12037-79-5 (ZnP_{2}); 51810-70-9 (Zn_{x}P_{x})
3D model (JSmol)	Interactive image
ChemSpider	11344765
ECHA InfoCard	100.013.859
EC Number	234-867-3
PubChem CID	25113606
UNII	813396S1PC
CompTox Dashboard (EPA)	DTXSID1024386
- InChI: InChI=1S/2P.3Zn Key: NQDYSWQRWWTVJU-UHFFFAOYSA-N; InChI=1/2P.3Zn/rP2Zn3/c3-1-5-2-4 Key: NQDYSWQRWWTVJU-WGUIJFGEAN
- SMILES: [Zn]=P[Zn]P=[Zn]

Properties
Chemical formula	Zn_{3}P_{2}
Molar mass	258.12 g/mol
Appearance	dark gray
Odor	characteristic
Density	4.55 g/cm^{3}
Melting point	1,160 °C (2,120 °F; 1,430 K)
Solubility in water	reacts
Solubility	insoluble in ethanol, soluble in benzene, reacts with acids
Band gap	1.4-1.6 eV (direct)

Structure
Crystal structure	Tetragonal, tP40
Space group	P4_{2}/nmc, No. 137
Lattice constant	a = 8.0785 Å, c = 11.3966 Å
Formula units (Z)	8

Hazards
- Occupational safety and health (OHS/OSH)
Ingestion hazards	Fatal, acutely toxic
Inhalation hazards	High
- GHS labelling
Pictograms	(GHS02: Flammable) (GHS06: Toxic)
Signal word	Danger
Hazard statements	H260, H300
Precautionary statements	P223, P231+P232, P264, P270, P280, P301+P310, P321, P330, P335+P334, P370+P378, P402+P404, P405, P501
NFPA 704 (fire diamond)	4 3 2 W
- Lethal dose or concentration (LD, LC)
LD_{50} (median dose)	Oral; 42.6 mg/kg (Rat); 12 mg/kg (Rat); Dermal; 1123 mg/kg (Rat); 2000 mg/kg (Rabbit)
Safety data sheet (SDS)	ThermoFisher Scientific, revised 02/2020
- Except where otherwise noted, data are given for materials in their standard state (at 25 °C [77 °F], 100 kPa). verify (what is ?) Infobox references

Zinc phosphide (Zn_{3}P_{2}) is an inorganic chemical compound. It is a grey solid, although commercial samples are often dark or even black. It is used as a rodenticide. Zn_{3}P_{2} is a II-V semiconductor with a direct band gap of 1.5 eV and may have applications in photovoltaic cells. A second compound exists in the zinc-phosphorus system, zinc diphosphide (ZnP_{2}).

== Synthesis and reactions ==
Zinc phosphide can be prepared by the reaction of zinc with phosphorus; however, for critical applications, additional processing to remove arsenic compounds may be needed.

6 Zn + P_{4} → 2 Zn_{3}P_{2}

Another method of preparation include reacting tri-n-octylphosphine with dimethylzinc.

Zinc phosphide reacts with water to produce highly toxic phosphine (PH_{3}) and zinc hydroxide (Zn(OH)_{2}):

Zn_{3}P_{2} + 6 H_{2}O → 2 PH_{3} + 3 Zn(OH)_{2}

== Structure ==
Zn_{3}P_{2} has a room-temperature tetragonal form that converts to a cubic form at around 845 °C. In the room-temperature form there are discrete P atoms, zinc atoms are tetrahedrally coordinated and phosphorus six coordinate, with zinc atoms at 6 of the vertices of a distorted cube.

The crystalline structure of zinc phosphide is very similar to that of cadmium arsenide (Cd_{3}As_{2}), zinc arsenide (Zn_{3}As_{2}) and cadmium phosphide (Cd_{3}P_{2}). These compounds of the Zn-Cd-P-As quaternary system exhibit full continuous solid-solution.

== Applications ==
=== Photovoltaics ===
Zinc phosphide is an ideal candidate for thin film photovoltaic applications, for it has strong optical absorption and an almost ideal band gap (1.5eV). In addition to this, both zinc and phosphorus are found abundantly in the Earth's crust, meaning that material extraction cost is low compared with that of other thin film photovoltaics. Both zinc and phosphorus are also nontoxic, which is not the case for other common commercial thin film photovoltaics, like cadmium telluride.

Researchers at the University of Alberta were the first to successfully synthesize colloidal zinc phosphide. Before this, researchers were able to create efficient solar cells from bulk zinc phosphide, but their fabrication required temperatures greater than 850 °C or complicated vacuum deposition methods. By contrast, colloidal zinc phosphide nanoparticles, contained in a zinc phosphide "ink", allows for inexpensive, easy large-scale production, by means of slot-die coating or spray coating.

The testing and development of these zinc phosphide thin films is still in its early stages, but early results have been positive. Prototype heterojunction devices fabricated from zinc phosphide nanoparticle ink exhibited a rectification ratio of 600 and photosensitivity with an on/off ratio near 100. These are both acceptable suitability benchmarks for solar cells. Development still needs to be made on optimizing the nanoparticle ink formation and device architecture before commercialization is possible, but commercial spray-on zinc phosphide solar cells may be possible within ten years.

=== Pest control ===
==== Rodenticide ====
Metal phosphides have been used as rodenticides. A mixture of food and zinc phosphide is left where the rodents can eat it. The acid in the digestive system of the rodent reacts with the phosphide to generate toxic phosphine gas. This method of vermin control has possible use in places where rodents are immune to other common poisons. Other pesticides similar to zinc phosphide are aluminium phosphide and calcium phosphide.

Zn_{3}P_{2} + 6H^{+} → 3Zn^{++} + PH_{3} ↑

Zinc phosphide is typically added to rodent baits in amount of around 0.75-2%. Such baits have a strong, pungent garlic-like odor characteristic of phosphine liberated by hydrolysis. The odor attracts rodents, but has a repulsive effect on other animals. The baits have to contain sufficient amount of zinc phosphide in sufficiently attractive food in order to kill rodents in a single serving; a sublethal dose may cause aversion towards zinc phosphide baits encountered by surviving rodents in the future.

Rodenticide-grade zinc phosphide usually comes as a black powder containing 75% of zinc phosphide and 25% of antimony potassium tartrate, an emetic to cause vomiting if the material is accidentally ingested by humans or domestic animals. However, it is still effective against rats, mice, guinea pigs and rabbits, none of which have a vomiting reflex.

==== Pest control in New Zealand ====
The New Zealand Environmental Protection Authority has approved the import and manufacture of Microencapsulated Zinc Phosphide (MZP Paste) for the ground control of possums. The application was made by Pest Tech Limited, with support from Connovation Ltd, Lincoln University and the Animal Health Board. It will be used as an additional vertebrate poison in certain situations. Unlike 1080 poison, it cannot be used for aerial application.

== Safety ==
Zinc phosphide is highly toxic, especially when ingested or inhaled. The reason for its toxicity is the release of phosphorus compounds, usually phosphine, when it reacts with water and acids. Phosphine is very toxic and, with trace amounts of P_{2}H_{4}, pyrophoric. Phosphine is also denser than air and may remain close to the ground without sufficient ventilation.
