= Conyers Herring =

American physicist

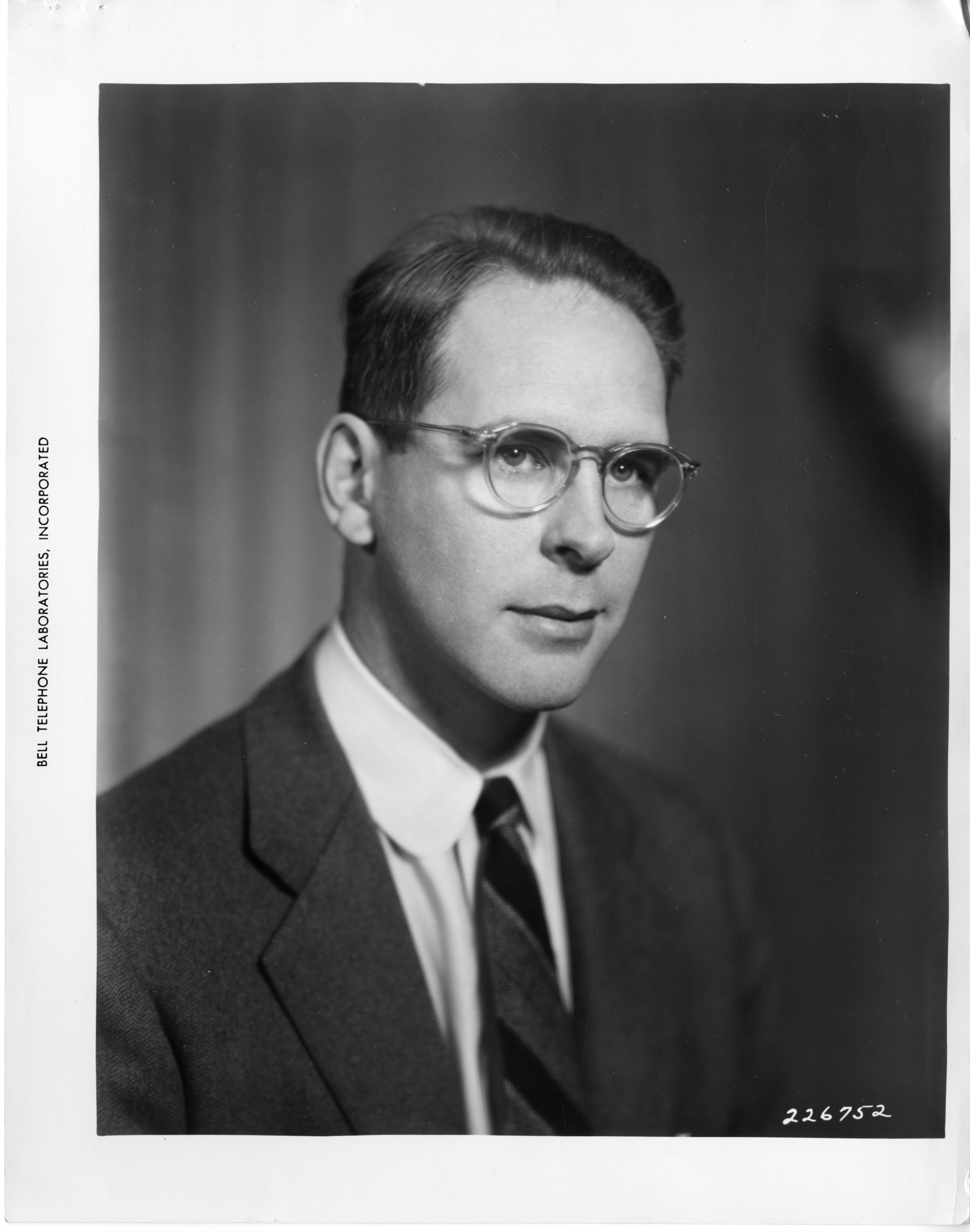
- Herring in 1959
- Born: William Conyers Herring; November 15, 1914; Scotia, New York, U.S.
- Died: July 23, 2009 (aged 94); Palo Alto, California, U.S.
- Education: Princeton University
- Known for: Weyl semimetal Nabarro–Herring creep Holstein–Herring method
- Awards: Oliver E. Buckley Condensed Matter Prize (1959); NAS Award for Scientific Reviewing (1980); Wolf Prize (1984/5)
- Scientific career
- Fields: Physics
- Workplaces: Bell Labs; Stanford University
- Thesis: On Energy Coincidences in the Theory of Brillouin Zones (1937)
- Doctoral advisor: Eugene Wigner

William Conyers Herring (November 15, 1914 – July 23, 2009) was an American physicist. He was a professor of applied physics at Stanford University and the Wolf Prize in Physics recipient in 1984/5.

== Academic career ==
Conyers Herring completed his Ph.D. in physics from Princeton University in 1937, submitting a dissertation entitled On Energy Coincidences in the Theory of Brillouin Zones under the direction of Eugene Wigner. In 1946, he joined the technical staff of Bell Laboratories in Murray Hill, New Jersey, where he remained until 1978. Then, he joined the faculty at Stanford University.

== Contributions ==
Conyers Herring played a major role in the development of solid state physics.

He laid the foundations of band structure calculations of metals and semiconductors, culminating in the discovery of the Orthogonalized Plane Wave Method (O.P.W.) in 1940. He was years ahead of his time in this contribution. A great deal of modern solid state physics as produced today stems from this original and early paper.

In 1937, he predicted the existence of Weyl semimetal, materials that display Weyl quasiparticles, which were experimentally demonstrated in 2015.

His influence on the development of solid state physics extends to a deep understanding of many facets such as surface physics, of thermionic emission, of transport phenomena in semiconductors and of collective excitations in solids such as spin waves.

He created the theoretical physics division at Bell Telephone Laboratory. Because of this, the total research effort at this institution and brought about much of the most original research in condensed matter physics during the latter half of the 20th century.

He has also been influential in promoting international cooperation among scientists and through his character and his personal example, he has exemplified an unattainable ideal of how a research scholar in any field should operate.

He has contributed to religion and science discussions. He has stated about God that "Things such as truth, goodness, even happiness, are achievable by virtue of a force that is always present, in the here and now and available to me personally".

== Brain box ==
Herring was famously well-read in the physics literature, and summarized references he found valuable on 3-by-5-inch (76 by 127 mm) index cards. He stored these cards, cataloged by topic, in a black suitcase that he referred to as his "brain box". Started in his student days, the brain box grew throughout his career, eventually containing 15,000 index cards with over 100,000 references. A project to digitize the brain box was undertaken by Robert B. Laughlin after Herring's death.

== Awards and honors ==
In June 1954 he was one of twenty scientists under the age of forty identified by Fortune Magazine as "top young scientists in U. S. universities and industry". In 1984/85 Conyers Herring was awarded the Wolf Prize in Physics along with Philippe Nozieres for "their major contributions to the fundamental theory of solids, especially of the behaviour of electrons in metals". In 1980 he was awarded the NAS Award for Scientific Reviewing from the National Academy of Sciences.

== See also ==
- Holstein–Herring method
- Nabarro–Herring creep
