= Strontium disilicide =

Names
- Other names Strontium silicide, strontium(II) silicide

Identifiers
CAS Number	12138-28-2
3D model (JSmol)	Interactive image
ChemSpider	95796049
ECHA InfoCard	100.032.031
EC Number	235-248-0
PubChem CID	138395194
CompTox Dashboard (EPA)	DTXSID301014285
- InChI: InChI=1S/2Si.Sr/q2*-1;+2 Key: DXKAKWDPPFFMSM-UHFFFAOYSA-N
- SMILES: [Si-].[Si-].[Sr+2]

Properties
Chemical formula	Si_{2}Sr
Molar mass	143.79 g·mol^{−1}
Appearance	silver-gray crystals
Density	3.35 g/cm^{3}
Melting point	1,100 °C (2,010 °F; 1,370 K)
Solubility in water	reacts with water

Structure
Crystal structure	Cubic
- Except where otherwise noted, data are given for materials in their standard state (at 25 °C [77 °F], 100 kPa). Infobox references

Strontium disilicide is a binary inorganic compound of strontium and silicon with the chemical formula SrSi_{2}.

== Synthesis ==
Synthesis of strontium disilicide can be by fusion of strontium oxide or strontium carbonate with silicon, or silicon oxide and with coal:

SrO + 2Si + С → SrSi_{2} + CO
SrCO_{3} + 2SiO_{2} + 4C → SrSi_{2} + 4CO + CO_{2}

== Physical properties ==
Strontium disilicide forms silver-gray crystals of the cubic system, space group P4_{1}32. The unit cell parameters are a = 6.540 Å. The density is measured at 3.40 kg/l but based on the unit cell size, it should be 3.43 kg/l. The silicon atoms form a three-dimensional lattice with the smallest Si-Si distance being 2.41 Å which is slightly more than in solid silicon. Si-Si-Si angles ∠ are 113.03°. Each silicon atom connects to three other silicon atoms. Eight silicon atoms surround each strontium atom, six at 3.21 Å and two at 3.43 Å.

== Chemical properties ==
Water decomposes the compound:

SrSi_{2} + 6H_{2}O → Sr(OH)_{2} + 2SiO_{2} + 5H_{2}

Also, the compound reacts with mineral acids.

== Uses ==
SrSi_{2} is reported to be a narrow-gap semiconductor or even a Weyl semimetal, with holes as the dominant charge carriers. The potential applications include thermoelectric devices and other applications where its unique properties can be utilized.
