= Weyl equation =

Relativistic wave equation describing massless fermions

In physics, particularly in quantum field theory, the Weyl equation (/vaɪl/ VILE) is a relativistic wave equation for describing massless spin-1/2 particles which have an inherent handedness, or chirality, called Weyl fermions. The equation is named after Hermann Weyl. The Weyl fermions are one of the three possible types of elementary fermions, the other two being the Dirac and the Majorana fermions.

None of the elementary particles in the Standard Model are Weyl fermions. Previous to the confirmation of the neutrino oscillations, it was considered possible that the neutrino might be a Weyl fermion (it is now expected to be either a Dirac or a Majorana fermion). In condensed matter physics, some materials can display quasiparticles that behave as Weyl fermions, leading to the notion of Weyl semimetals.

Mathematically, any Dirac fermion can be decomposed as two Weyl fermions of opposite chirality coupled by the mass term.

== History ==
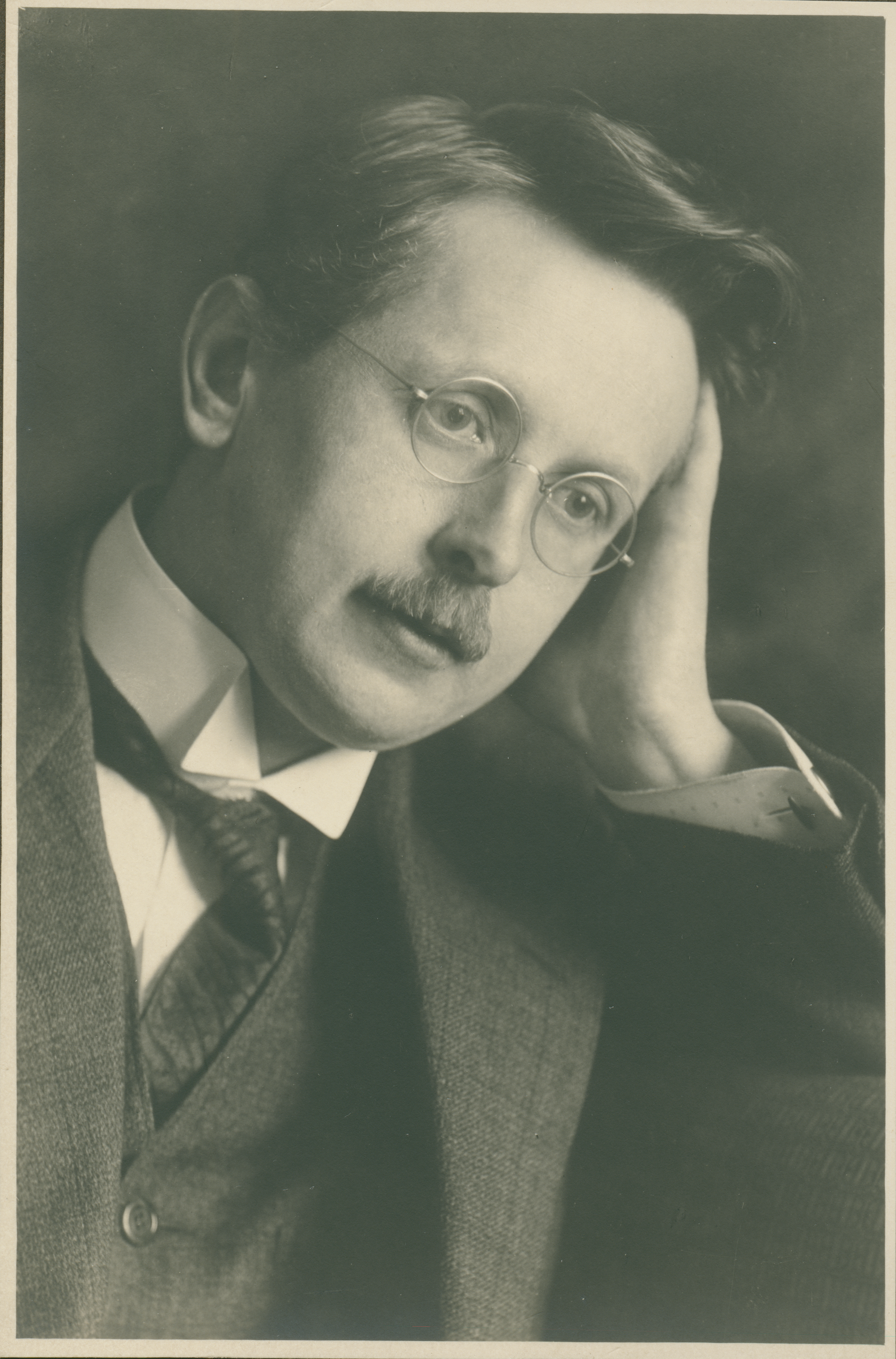
Hermann Weyl c. 1928

The Dirac equation was published in 1928 by Paul Dirac, and was first used to model spin-1/2 particles in the framework of relativistic quantum mechanics. Hermann Weyl published his equation in 1929 as a simplified version of the Dirac equation. Wolfgang Pauli wrote in 1933 against Weyl's equation because it violated parity. However, three years before, Pauli had predicted the existence of a new elementary fermion, the neutrino, to explain the beta decay, which eventually was described using the Weyl equation.

In 1937, Conyers Herring proposed that Weyl fermions may exist as quasiparticles in condensed matter.

Neutrinos were experimentally observed in 1956 as particles with extremely small masses (and historically were even sometimes thought to be massless). The same year the Wu experiment showed that parity could be violated by the weak interaction, addressing Pauli's criticism. This was followed by the measurement of the neutrino's helicity in 1958. As experiments showed no signs of a neutrino mass, interest in the Weyl equation resurfaced. Thus, the Standard Model was built under the assumption that neutrinos were Weyl fermions.

While Italian physicist Bruno Pontecorvo had proposed in 1957 the possibility of neutrino masses and neutrino oscillations, it was not until 1998 that Super-Kamiokande eventually confirmed the existence of neutrino oscillations, and their non-zero mass. This discovery confirmed that Weyl's equation cannot completely describe the propagation of neutrinos, as the equations can only describe massless particles.

In 2015, the first Weyl semimetal was demonstrated experimentally in crystalline tantalum arsenide (TaAs) by the collaboration of M.Z. Hasan's (Princeton University) and H. Ding's (Chinese Academy of Sciences) teams. Independently, the same year, M. Soljačić team (Massachusetts Institute of Technology) also observed Weyl-like excitations in photonic crystals.

== Equation ==
The Weyl equation comes in two forms. The right-handed form can be written as follows:
$$\sigma^\mu\partial_\mu \psi = 0.$$

Expanding this equation, and inserting $c$ for the speed of light, it becomes

$$I_2 \frac{1}{c}\frac{\partial \psi}{\partial t} + \sigma_x\frac{\partial \psi}{\partial x} + \sigma_y\frac{\partial \psi}{\partial y} + \sigma_z\frac{\partial \psi}{\partial z} = 0,$$

where

$$\sigma^\mu = \begin{pmatrix}\sigma^0 & \sigma^1 & \sigma^2 & \sigma^3\end{pmatrix} = \begin{pmatrix}I_2 & \sigma_x & \sigma_y & \sigma_z\end{pmatrix}$$

is a vector whose components are the 2×2 identity matrix $I_2$ for $\mu = 0$ and the Pauli matrices for $\mu = 1, 2, 3$, and $\psi$ is the wavefunction – one of the Weyl spinors. The left-handed form of the Weyl equation is usually written as

$$\bar{\sigma}^\mu\partial_\mu \psi = 0,$$

where
$$\bar{\sigma}^\mu = \begin{pmatrix}I_2 & -\sigma_x & -\sigma_y & -\sigma_z\end{pmatrix}.$$

The solutions of the right- and left-handed Weyl equations are different: they have right- and left-handed helicity, and thus chirality, respectively. It is convenient to indicate this explicitly, as follows: $\sigma^\mu\partial_\mu \psi_{\rm R} = 0$ and $\bar{\sigma}^\mu\partial_\mu \psi_{\rm L} = 0$.

== Plane wave solutions ==
The plane-wave solutions to the Weyl equation are referred to as the left- and right-handed Weyl spinors, each is with two components. Both have the form

$$\psi\left(\mathbf{r}, t\right) = \begin{pmatrix}
\psi_1 \\
\psi_2 \\
\end{pmatrix} =
\chi e^{-i(\mathbf{k}\cdot\mathbf{r} - \omega t)} =
\chi e^{-i(\mathbf{p}\cdot\mathbf{r} - Et)/\hbar},$$

where

$$\chi = \begin{pmatrix}
\chi_1 \\
\chi_2 \\
\end{pmatrix}$$

is a momentum-dependent two-component spinor which satisfies

$$\sigma^\mu p_\mu \chi =
\left( I_2 E - \vec{\sigma} \cdot \vec{p} \right) \chi =
0$$

or
$$\bar{\sigma}^\mu p_\mu \chi =
\left( I_2 E + \vec{\sigma} \cdot \vec{p} \right) \chi =
0.$$

By direct manipulation, one obtains that
$$\left(\bar{\sigma}^\nu p_\nu\right) \left(\sigma^\mu p_\mu\right) \chi =
\left(\sigma^\nu p_\nu\right) \left(\bar{\sigma}^\mu p_\mu\right) \chi =
p_\mu p^\mu \chi =
\left(E^2 - \vec{p}\cdot\vec{p}\right) \chi = 0,$$
and concludes that the equations correspond to a particle that is massless. As a result, the magnitude of momentum $\mathbf{p}$ relates directly to the wave-vector $\mathbf{k}$ by the de Broglie relations as

$$|\mathbf{p}| = \hbar |\mathbf{k}| = \frac{\hbar\omega}{c} \, \Rightarrow \, |\mathbf{k}| = \frac{\omega}{c}.$$

The equation can be written in terms of left- and right-handed spinors as

$$\begin{align}
\sigma^\mu \partial_\mu \psi_{\rm R} &= 0, \\
\bar{\sigma}^\mu \partial_\mu \psi_{\rm L} &= 0.
\end{align}$$

=== Helicity ===
The left and right components correspond to the helicity $\lambda$ of the particles, the projection of angular momentum operator $\mathbf{J}$ onto the linear momentum $\mathbf{p}$:

$$\mathbf{p}\cdot\mathbf{J}\left|\mathbf{p},\lambda\right\rangle =
\lambda |\mathbf{p}|\left|\mathbf{p},\lambda\right\rangle.$$

Here $\textstyle \lambda = \pm\frac{1}{2}$.

== Lorentz invariance ==
Both equations are Lorentz invariant under the Lorentz transformation $x \mapsto x^\prime = \Lambda x$ where $\Lambda \in \mathrm{SO}(1,3)$. More precisely, the equations transform as
$$\sigma^\mu\frac{\partial}{\partial x^\mu} \psi_{\rm R}(x)
\mapsto \sigma^\mu\frac{\partial}{\partial x^{\prime\mu}} \psi^\prime_{\rm R}\left(x^\prime\right)
= \left(S^{-1}\right)^\dagger \sigma^\mu\frac{\partial}{\partial x^\mu} \psi_{\rm R}(x),$$

where $S^\dagger$ is the Hermitian transpose, provided that the right-handed field transforms as

$$\psi_{\rm R}(x) \mapsto \psi^\prime_{\rm R}\left(x^\prime\right) = S\psi_{\rm R}(x).$$

The matrix $S \in SL(2,\mathbb{C})$ is related to the Lorentz transform by means of the double covering of the Lorentz group by the special linear group $\mathrm{SL}(2, \mathbb{C})$ given by
$$\sigma_\mu {\Lambda^\mu}_\nu = \left(S^{-1}\right)^\dagger \sigma_\nu S^{-1}.$$

Thus, if the untransformed differential vanishes in one Lorentz frame, then it also vanishes in another. Similarly

$$\overline{\sigma}^\mu\frac{\partial}{\partial x^\mu} \psi_{\rm L}(x)
\mapsto \overline{\sigma}^\mu\frac{\partial}{\partial x^{\prime\mu}} \psi^\prime_{\rm L}\left(x^\prime\right)
= S \overline{\sigma}^\mu\frac{\partial}{\partial x^\mu} \psi_{\rm L}(x),$$

provided that the left-handed field transforms as

$$\psi_{\rm L}(x) \mapsto \psi^\prime_{\rm L}\left(x^\prime\right) = \left(S^\dagger\right)^{-1}\psi_{\rm L}(x).$$

Proof: Neither of these transformation properties are in any way "obvious", and so deserve a careful derivation. Begin with the form

$$\psi_{\rm R}(x) \mapsto \psi^\prime_{\rm R}\left(x^\prime\right) = R\psi_{\rm R}(x)$$

for some unknown $R \in \mathrm{SL}(2, \mathbb{C})$ to be determined. The Lorentz transform, in coordinates, is
$$x^{\prime\mu} = {\Lambda^\mu}_\nu x^\nu,$$
or, equivalently,
$$x^\nu = {\left(\Lambda^{-1}\right)^\nu}_\mu x^{\prime\mu}.$$

This leads to
$$\begin{align}
\sigma^\mu \partial^\prime_\mu \psi^\prime_{\rm R}\left(x^\prime\right)
&= \sigma^\mu\frac{\partial}{\partial x^{\prime\mu}} \psi^\prime_{\rm R}\left(x^\prime\right) \\
&= \sigma^\mu \frac{\partial x^\nu}{\partial x^{\prime\mu}} \frac{\partial}{\partial x^\nu} R \psi_{\rm R}(x) \\
&= \sigma^\mu {\left(\Lambda^{-1}\right)^\nu}_\mu \frac{\partial}{\partial x^\nu} R\psi_{\rm R}(x) \\
&= \sigma^\mu {\left(\Lambda^{-1}\right)^\nu}_\mu \partial_\nu R\psi_{\rm R}(x).
\end{align}$$

In order to make use of the Weyl map
$$\sigma_\mu{\Lambda^\mu}_\nu = \left(S^{-1}\right)^\dagger\sigma_\nu S^{-1},$$
a few indexes must be raised and lowered. This is easier said than done, as it invokes the identity
$$\eta\Lambda^\mathsf{T}\eta = \Lambda^{-1},$$
where $\eta = \mbox{diag}(+1, -1, -1, -1)$ is the flat-space Minkowski metric. The above identity is often used to define the elements $\Lambda\in \mathrm{SO}(1,3)$. One takes the transpose
$${\left(\Lambda^{-1}\right)^\nu}_\mu = {\left(\Lambda^{-1\mathsf{T}}\right)_\mu}^\nu$$
to write
$$\begin{align}
\sigma^\mu {\left(\Lambda^{-1}\right)^\nu}_\mu \partial_\nu R\psi_{\rm R}(x)
&= \sigma^\mu {\left(\Lambda^{-1\mathsf{T}}\right)_\mu}^\nu \partial_\nu R\psi_{\rm R}(x) \\
&= \sigma_\mu {\Lambda^\mu}_\nu \partial^\nu R\psi_{\rm R}(x) \\
&= \left(S^{-1}\right)^\dagger \sigma_\mu \partial^\mu S^{-1} R\psi_{\rm R}(x).
\end{align}$$
One thus regains the original form if $S^{-1} R = 1$, that is, $R = S$. Performing the same manipulations for the left-handed equation, one concludes that
$$\psi_{\rm L}(x)\mapsto \psi^\prime_{\rm L}\left(x^\prime\right) = L\psi_{\rm L}(x)$$
with $L = \left(S^\dagger\right)^{-1}$. (Note: The results presented here are identical to those of Aste (2010) equations 52 and 57, although the derivation performed here is completely different. The double-covering used here is also identical to Aste's equation 48, and to the current version (December 2020) of the Wikipedia article on the Lorentz group.)

=== Relationship to Majorana ===
The Weyl equation is conventionally interpreted as describing a massless particle. However, with a slight alteration, one may obtain a two-component version of the Majorana equation. This arises because the special linear group $\mathrm{SL}(2,\mathbb{C})$ is isomorphic to the symplectic group $\mathrm{Sp}(2,\mathbb{C})$. The symplectic group is defined as the set of all complex 2×2 matrices that satisfy

$$S^\mathsf{T} \omega S = \omega,$$

where
$$\omega = i\sigma_2 = \begin{bmatrix} 0 & 1 \\ -1 & 0 \end{bmatrix}.$$

The defining relationship can be rewritten as $\omega S^* = \left( S^\dagger \right)^{-1} \omega$, where $S^*$ is the complex conjugate. The right-handed field, as noted earlier, transforms as

$$\psi_{\rm R}(x) \mapsto \psi^\prime_{\rm R}\left(x^\prime\right) = S\psi_{\rm R}(x),$$

and so the complex conjugate field transforms as

$$\psi^*_{\rm R}(x) \mapsto \psi^{\prime *}_{\rm R}\left(x^\prime\right) = S^*\psi^*_{\rm R}(x).$$

Applying the defining relationship, one concludes that

$$m \omega \psi^*_{\rm R}(x) \mapsto m \omega \psi^{\prime *}_{\rm R} \left(x^\prime\right) = \left(S^\dagger\right)^{-1} m \omega \psi^*_{\rm R}(x),$$

which is exactly the same Lorentz covariance property noted earlier. Thus, the linear combination, using an arbitrary complex phase factor $\eta = e^{i\phi}$,

$$i\sigma^\mu \partial_\mu \psi_{\rm R}(x) + \eta m \omega \psi^*_{\rm R}(x),$$

transforms in a covariant fashion; setting this to zero gives the complex two-component Majorana equation. The Majorana equation is conventionally written as a four-component real equation, rather than a two-component complex equation; the above can be brought into four-component form (see that article for details). Similarly, the left-chiral Majorana equation (including an arbitrary phase factor $\zeta$) is

$$i\overline{\sigma}^\mu \partial_\mu \psi_{\rm L}(x) + \zeta m \omega \psi^*_{\rm L}(x) = 0.$$

As noted earlier, the left and right chiral versions are related by a parity transformation. The skew complex conjugate $\omega\psi^* = i\sigma^2\psi$ can be recognized as the charge conjugate form of $\psi$. Thus, the Majorana equation can be read as an equation that connects a spinor to its charge-conjugate form. The two distinct phases on the mass term are related to the two distinct eigenvalues of the charge conjugation operator; see charge conjugation and Majorana equation for details.

Define a pair of operators, the Majorana operators,
$$D_{\rm L} = i\overline{\sigma}^\mu \partial_\mu +\zeta m\omega K,\qquad
D_{\rm R} = i\sigma^\mu \partial_\mu + \eta m\omega K,$$
where $K$ is a short-hand reminder to take the complex conjugate. Under Lorentz transformations, these transform as
$$D_{\rm L} \mapsto D^\prime_{\rm L} = S D_{\rm L} S^\dagger, \qquad
D_{\rm R} \mapsto D^\prime_{\rm R} = \left(S^\dagger\right)^{-1} D_{\rm R} S^{-1},$$
whereas the Weyl spinors transform as
$$\psi_{\rm L} \mapsto \psi^\prime_{\rm L} = \left(S^\dagger\right)^{-1} \psi_{\rm L}, \qquad
\psi_{\rm R} \mapsto \psi^\prime_{\rm R} = S \psi_{\rm R},$$
just as above. Thus, the matched combinations of these are Lorentz covariant, and one may take
$$D_{\rm L} \psi_{\rm L} = 0 \qquad D_{\rm R} \psi_{\rm R} = 0$$

as a pair of complex 2-spinor Majorana equations.

The products $D_{\rm L} D_{\rm R}$ and $D_{\rm R} D_{\rm L}$ are both Lorentz covariant. The product is explicitly
$$D_{\rm R}D_{\rm L}
= \left(i\sigma^\mu \partial_\mu + \eta m\omega K\right) \left(i\overline{\sigma}^\mu \partial_\mu + \zeta m\omega K\right)
= -\left(\partial_t^2 - \vec\nabla \cdot \vec\nabla + \eta\zeta^* m^2\right)
= -\left(\square + \eta\zeta^* m^2\right).$$
Verifying this requires keeping in mind that $\omega^2 = -1$ and that $K i = -i K$. The RHS reduces to the Klein–Gordon operator provided that $\eta\zeta^* = 1$, that is, $\eta = \zeta$. These two Majorana operators are thus "square roots" of the Klein–Gordon operator.

== Lagrangian densities ==
The equations are obtained from the Lagrangian densities

$$\mathcal L = i \psi_{\rm R}^\dagger \sigma^\mu \partial_\mu \psi_{\rm R},$$

$$\mathcal L = i \psi_{\rm L}^\dagger \bar\sigma^\mu \partial_\mu \psi_{\rm L}.$$

By treating the spinor and its conjugate (denoted by $\dagger$) as independent variables, the relevant Weyl equation is obtained.

== Weyl spinors ==
The term Weyl spinor is also frequently used in a more general setting, as an element of a Clifford module. This is closely related to the solutions given above, and gives a natural geometric interpretation to spinors as geometric objects living on a manifold. This general setting has multiple strengths: it clarifies their interpretation as fermions in physics, and it shows precisely how to define spin in General Relativity, or, indeed, for any Riemannian manifold or pseudo-Riemannian manifold. This is informally sketched as follows.

The Weyl equation is invariant under the action of the Lorentz group. This means that, as boosts and rotations are applied, the form of the equation itself does not change. However, the form of the spinor $\psi$ itself does change. Ignoring spacetime entirely, the algebra of the spinors is described by a (complexified) Clifford algebra. The spinors transform under the action of the spin group. This is entirely analogous to how one might talk about a vector, and how it transforms under the rotation group, except that now, it has been adapted to the case of spinors.

Given an arbitrary pseudo-Riemannian manifold $M$ of dimension $(p,q)$, one may consider its tangent bundle $TM$. At any given point $x \in M$, the tangent space $T_x M$ is a $(p,q)$-dimensional vector space. Given this vector space, one can construct the Clifford algebra $\mathrm{Cl}(p,q)$ on it. If $\{e_i\}$ are a vector space basis on $T_x M$, one may construct a pair of Weyl spinors as

$$w_j = \frac{1}{\sqrt{2}} \left(e_{2j} + ie_{2j+1}\right)$$
and
$$w_j^* = \frac{1}{\sqrt{2}} \left(e_{2j} - ie_{2j+1}\right).$$

When properly examined in light of the Clifford algebra, these are naturally anti-commuting, that is, one has that $w_j w_m = -w_m w_j$. This can be happily interpreted as the mathematical realization of the Pauli exclusion principle, thus allowing these abstractly defined formal structures to be interpreted as fermions. For ${{{1}}}$-dimensional Minkowski space-time, there are only two such spinors possible, by convention labelled "left" and "right", as described above. A more formal, general presentation of Weyl spinors can be found in the article on the spin group.

The abstract, general-relativistic form of the Weyl equation can be understood as follows: Given a pseudo-Riemannian manifold $M$, one constructs a fiber bundle above it, with the spin group as the fiber. The spin group $\mathrm{Spin}(p,q)$ is a double cover of the special orthogonal group $\mathrm{SO}(p,q)$, and so one can identify the spin group fiber-wise with the frame bundle over $M$. When this is done, the resulting structure is called a spin structure.

Selecting a single point on the fiber corresponds to selecting a local coordinate frame for spacetime; two different points on the fiber are related by a (Lorentz) boost/rotation, that is, by a local change of coordinates. The natural inhabitants of the spin structure are the Weyl spinors, in that the spin structure completely describes how the spinors behave under (Lorentz) boosts/rotations.

Given a spin manifold, the analog of the metric connection is the spin connection; this is effectively "the same thing" as the normal connection, just with spin indexes attached to it in a consistent fashion. The covariant derivative can be defined in terms of the connection in an entirely conventional way. It acts naturally on the Clifford bundle; the Clifford bundle is the space in which the spinors live. The general exploration of such structures and their relationships is termed spin geometry.

=== Mathematical definition ===
For even $n$, the even subalgebra $\mathbb{C}l^0(n)$ of the complex Clifford algebra $\mathbb{C}l(n)$ is isomorphic to $\mathrm{End}(\mathbb{C}^{N/2}) \oplus \mathrm{End}(\mathbb{C}^{N/2}) =: \Delta^+_n \oplus \Delta^-_n$, where $N = 2^{n/2}$. A left-handed (respectively, right-handed) complex Weyl spinor in $n$-dimensional space is an element of $\Delta^+_n$ (respectively, $\Delta^-_n$).

=== Special cases ===
There are three important special cases that can be constructed from Weyl spinors. One is the Dirac spinor, which can be taken to be a pair of Weyl spinors, one left-handed, and one right-handed. These are coupled together in such a way as to represent an electrically charged fermion field. The electric charge arises because the Dirac field transforms under the action of the complexified spin group $\mathrm{Spin}^\mathbb{C}(p,q)$. This group has the structure
$$\mathrm{Spin}^\mathbb{C}(p,q)\cong\mathrm{Spin}(p,q)\times_{\mathbb{Z}_2} S^1,$$

where $S^1\cong \mathrm{U}(1)$ is the circle, and can be identified with the $\mathrm{U}(1)$ of electromagnetism. The product $\times_{\mathbb{Z}_2}$ is just fancy notation denoting the product $\mathrm{Spin}(p,q)\times S^1$ with opposite points $(s,u) = (-s,-u)$ identified (a double covering).

The Majorana spinor is again a pair of Weyl spinors, but this time arranged so that the left-handed spinor is the charge conjugate of the right-handed spinor. The result is a field with two less degrees of freedom than the Dirac spinor. It is unable to interact with the electromagnetic field, since it transforms as a scalar under the action of the $\mathrm{spin}^\mathbb{C}$ group. That is, it transforms as a spinor, but transversally, such that it is invariant under the $\mathrm{U}(1)$ action of the spin group.

The third special case is the ELKO spinor, constructed much as the Majorana spinor, except with an additional minus sign between the charge-conjugate pair. This again renders it electrically neutral, but introduces a number of other quite surprising properties.
