= Dirac cone =

Quantum effect in some non-metals

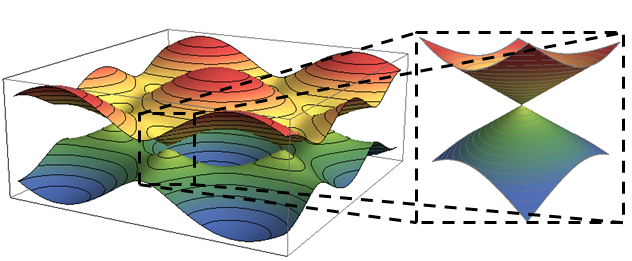
Electronic band structure of monolayer graphene, with a zoomed inset showing the Dirac cones. There are 6 cones corresponding to the 6 vertices of the hexagonal first Brillouin zone.

In physics, Dirac cones are features that occur in some electronic band structures that describe unusual electron transport properties of materials like graphene and topological insulators. In these materials, at energies near the Fermi level, the valence band and conduction band take the shape of the upper and lower halves of a conical surface, meeting at what are called Dirac points.

Typical examples include graphene, topological insulators, bismuth antimony thin films and some other novel nanomaterials, in which the electronic energy and momentum have a linear dispersion relation such that the electronic band structure near the Fermi level takes the shape of an upper conical surface for the electrons and a lower conical surface for the holes. The two conical surfaces touch each other and form a zero-band gap semimetal.

The name of Dirac cone comes from the Dirac equation that can describe relativistic particles in quantum mechanics, proposed by Paul Dirac. Isotropic Dirac cones in graphene were first predicted by P. R. Wallace in 1947 and experimentally observed by the Nobel Prize laureates Andre Geim and Konstantin Novoselov in 2005.

== Description ==
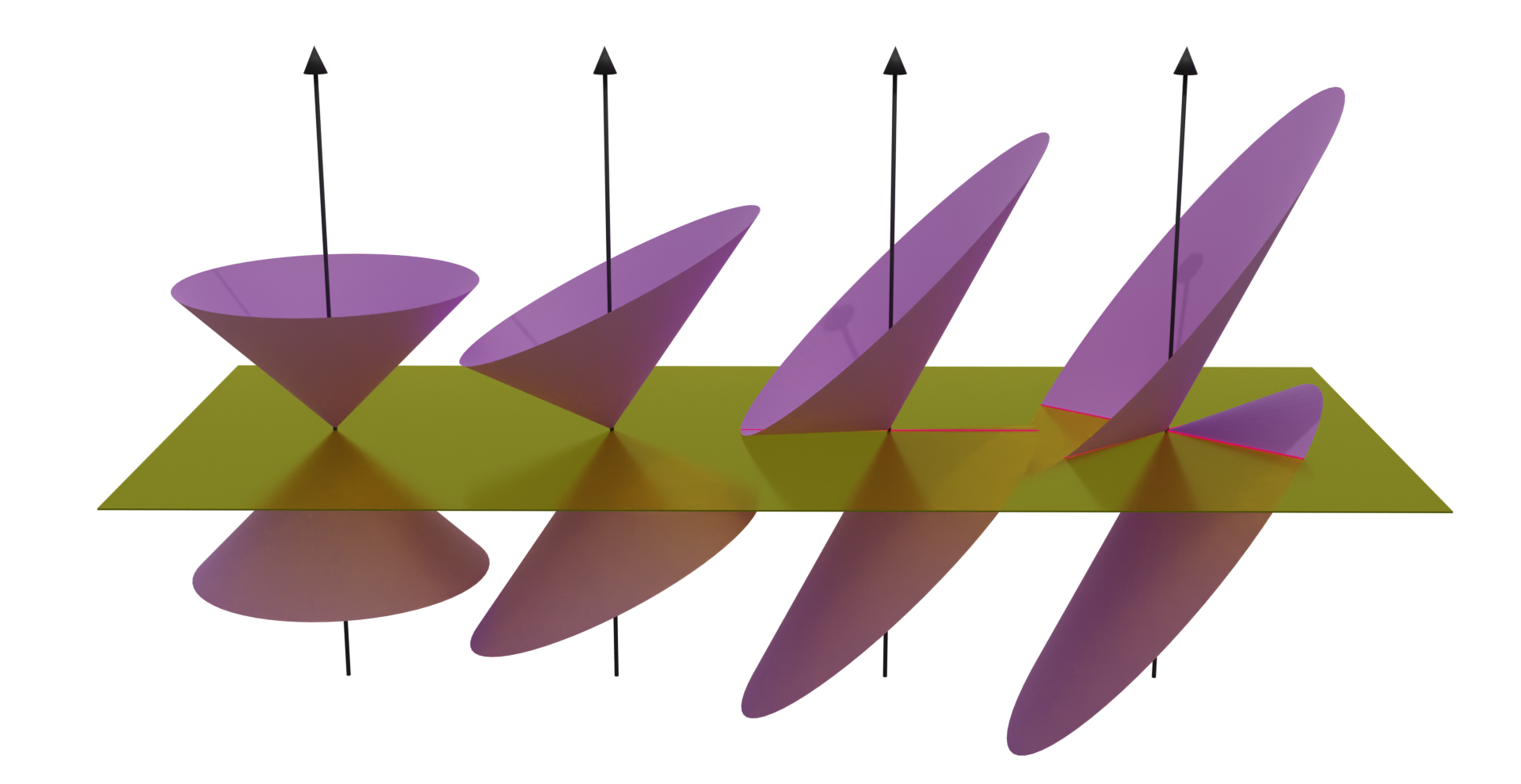
Tilted Dirac cones in momentum space. From left to right, the tilt increases, from no tilt in the first cone to overtilt in the last. The three first are Type-I Weyl semimetals, the last one is a Type-II Weyl semimetal.

In quantum mechanics, Dirac cones are a kind of crossing-point which electrons avoid, where the energy of the valence and conduction bands are not equal anywhere in two dimensional lattice k-space, except at the zero dimensional Dirac points. As a result of the cones, electrical conduction can be described by the movement of charge carriers which are massless fermions, a situation which is handled theoretically by the relativistic Dirac equation. The massless fermions lead to various quantum Hall effects, magnetoelectric effects in topological materials, and ultra high carrier mobility. Dirac cones were observed in 2008-2009, using angle-resolved photoemission spectroscopy (ARPES) on the potassium-graphite intercalation compound KC_{8} and on several bismuth-based alloys.

As an object with three dimensions, Dirac cones are a feature of two-dimensional materials or surface states, based on a linear dispersion relation between energy and the two components of the crystal momentum k_{x} and k_{y}. However, this concept can be extended to three dimensions, where Dirac semimetals are defined by a linear dispersion relation between energy and k_{x}, k_{y}, and k_{z}. In k-space, this shows up as a hypercone, which have doubly degenerate bands which also meet at Dirac points. Dirac semimetals contain both time reversal and spatial inversion symmetry; when one of these is broken, the Dirac points are split into two constituent Weyl points, and the material becomes a Weyl semimetal. In 2014, direct observation of the Dirac semimetal band structure using ARPES was conducted on the Dirac semimetal cadmium arsenide.

== Analog systems ==
Dirac points have been realized in many physical areas such as plasmonics, phononics, or nanophotonics (microcavities, photonic crystals).

== See also ==
- Dirac matter
