= Zinc arsenide =

Chemical compound of zinc and arsenic

Names
- Other names trizinc diarsenide

Identifiers
CAS Number	12006-40-5
3D model (JSmol)	Interactive image
ChemSpider	21242020
ECHA InfoCard	100.031.338
EC Number	234-486-2
PubChem CID	25147458
CompTox Dashboard (EPA)	DTXSID00893156
- InChI: InChI=1S/2As.3Zn Key: RHKSESDHCKYTHI-UHFFFAOYSA-N
- SMILES: [Zn].[Zn]=[As].[Zn]=[As]

Properties
Chemical formula	Zn_{3}As_{2}
Molar mass	345.984 g/mol
Appearance	Silver grey
Density	5.53 g/cm^{3}
Melting point	1,015 °C (1,859 °F; 1,288 K)
Solubility in water	Insoluble
Band gap	1.0 eV

Structure
Crystal structure	Tetragonal

Hazards
- GHS labelling
Pictograms	(GHS06: Toxic) (GHS08: Health hazard) (GHS09: Environmental hazard)
Signal word	Danger
Hazard statements	H301, H331, H350, H410
Precautionary statements	P201, P202, P222, P231+P232, P261, P264, P270, P271, P273, P280, P281, P301+P310+P330, P304+P340, P308+P313, P321, P370+P378, P391, P403+P233, P405, P422, P501
NFPA 704 (fire diamond)	4 0 0
- Safety data sheet (SDS)
- Except where otherwise noted, data are given for materials in their standard state (at 25 °C [77 °F], 100 kPa). Infobox references

Zinc arsenide (Zn_{3}As_{2}) is a binary compound of zinc with arsenic which forms gray tetragonal crystals. It is an inorganic semiconductor with a band gap of 1.0 eV.

== Synthesis and reactions ==
Zinc arsenide can be prepared by the reaction of zinc with arsenic

3 Zn + 2 As → Zn_{3}As_{2}

== Structure ==
Zn_{3}As_{2} has a room-temperature tetragonal form that converts to a different tetragonal phase at 190 °C and to a third phase at 651 °C. In the room-temperature form, the zinc atoms are tetrahedrally coordinated and the arsenic atoms are surrounded by six zinc atoms at the vertices of a distorted cube. The crystalline structure of zinc arsenide is very similar to that of cadmium arsenide (Cd_{3}As_{2}), zinc phosphide (Zn_{3}P_{2}) and cadmium phosphide (Cd_{3}P_{2}). These compounds of the Zn-Cd-P-As quaternary system exhibit full continuous solid-solution.

== Electronic structure ==
Its lowest direct and indirect bandgaps are within 30 meV of each other.
