= Tantalum arsenide =

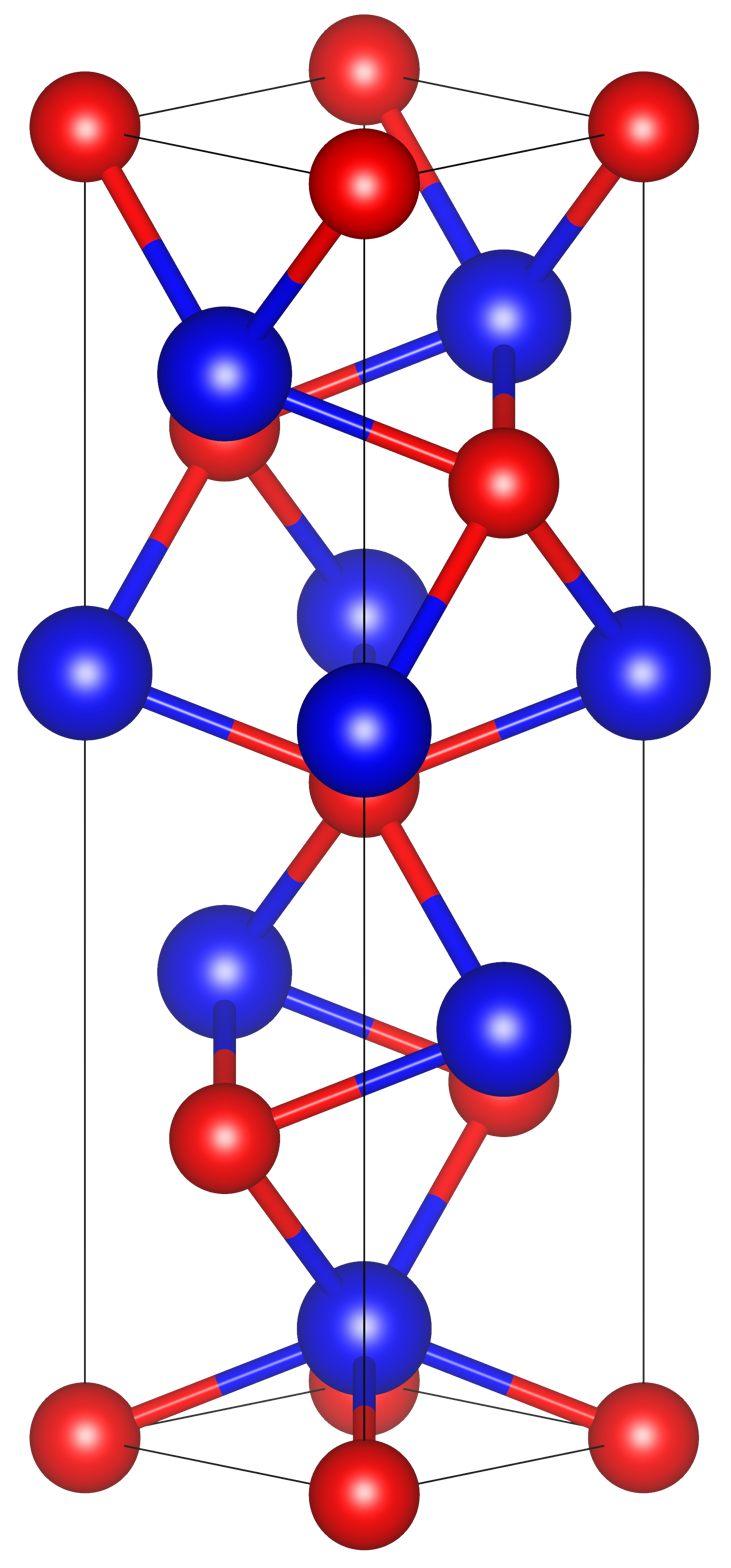
- Ta As

Identifiers
3D model (JSmol)	Interactive image
PubChem CID	161466357
- InChI: InChI=1S/As.Ta Key: WCMKFCQUZDOHAQ-UHFFFAOYSA-N
- SMILES: [As]#[Ta]

Properties
Chemical formula	TaAs
Molar mass	255.869 g/mol
Density	12.25 g/cm^{3}
Melting point	Decomposes at 1400°C

Structure
Crystal structure	Body-centered tetragonal
Space group	I4_{1}md, No. 109
Point group	4mm
Lattice constant	a = 3.44 Å, c = 11.65 Å
- Except where otherwise noted, data are given for materials in their standard state (at 25 °C [77 °F], 100 kPa). Infobox references

Tantalum arsenide is a compound of tantalum and arsenic with the formula TaAs. It is notable as being the first topological Weyl semimetal that was identified and characterized by ARPES. It exhibits an analogue of quantum vortices in momentum space.

== Structure ==
Tantalum arsenide crystallizes in a body-centered tetragonal unit cell with lattice parameters a = 3.44 Å and c = 11.65 Å. It belongs to the space group I4_{1}md.

== Preparation ==
TaAs has been prepared by decomposing TaAs_{2} at 900 °C. A more recent preparation yielded large, single crystals of TaAs by chemical vapor transport with elemental precursors and iodine as the transport agent:

TaI_{5} (g) + AsI_{3} (g) ↔ TaAs (s) + 4 I_{2} (g)
