= Zinc cadmium phosphide arsenide =

Semiconductor material

Zinc cadmium phosphide arsenide (Zn-Cd-P-As) is a quaternary system of group II (IUPAC group 12) and group V (IUPAC group 15) elements. Many of the inorganic compounds in the system are II-V semiconductor materials. The quaternary system of II_{3}V_{2} compounds, (Zn_{1−x}Cd_{x})_{3}(P_{1−y}As_{y})_{2}, has been shown to allow solid solution continuously over the whole compositional range. This material system and its subsets have applications in electronics, optoelectronics, including photovoltaics, and thermoelectrics.

== List of all binary compounds ==
This system of elements contains numerous binary compounds and their solid solutions.

=== Stable at atmospheric pressure ===
The binary compounds thermodynamically stable at atmospheric pressure are listed in the following table:

Anion Cation	P		As	
Zn	Zn_{3}P_{2}; ZnP_{2}	α″ (or α) and β; α and β	Zn_{3}As_{2}; ZnAs_{2}	α, α′ and β; one polymorph
Cd	Cd_{3}P_{2}; CdP_{2}; Cd_{2}P_{3}; CdP_{4}; Cd_{6}P_{7}	one polymorph; –; –; unconfirmed	Cd_{3}As_{2}; CdAs_{2}	α, α′, α″ and β; α and δ

=== Metastable or unstable at atmospheric pressure ===
Compounds metastable or unstable at atmospheric pressure are the following:

Anion Cation	P		As	
Zn	ZnP_{2}; ZnP_{4}; Zn_{7}P_{10}; Zn_{3}P_{2}	high-pressure rhombohedral phase; high-pressure tetragonal phase; high-pressure orthorhombic phase; high-pressure phase	Zn_{3}As_{2}; ZnAs	high-pressure phase; high-pressure phase, low and high-temperature polymorphs
Cd	Cd_{3}P_{2}	high-pressure phase	Cd_{3}As_{2}; CdAs; CdAs_{4}	high-pressure phase; high-pressure phase, low and high-temperature polymorphs

== Quaternary compounds ==
The compounds of the form II_{3}V_{2} have similar crystalline structures and exhibit full solid solution over the whole compositional range. The compounds of the form II-V_{2} allow only partial solid solution.

== Ternary compounds ==
The binary compounds in this system form a wide range of solid solutions. This miscibility reflects the close similarity of the structures of the binary phases. The IIV_{2} compounds exhibit wide solid solution ranges with CdP_{4} even though the stoichiometry and structures of the components differ.

The optoelectronic and band properties of some ternary compounds have also been studied. For example, the bandgap of Zn_{3}(P_{1−y}As_{y})_{2} solid solutions is direct and tunable from 1.0 eV to 1.5 eV. This solubility enables the fabrication of tunable nanowire photodetectors. The solid solution (Zn_{1−x}Cd_{x})_{3}As_{2} exhibit a topological phase transition at x ~ 0.62.

== Notable binary compounds ==
=== Cadmium arsenide (Cd_{3}As_{2}) ===
Cadmium arsenide is a 3D Dirac semimetal exhibiting the Nernst effect.

=== Zinc phosphide (Zn_{3}P_{2}) ===
Zinc phosphide is a semiconductor material with a direct band gap of 1.5 eV used in photovoltaics. It is also used as a rodenticide in the pest control industry.

=== Zinc arsenide (Zn_{3}As_{2}) ===
Zinc arsenide is a semiconductor material with a band gap of 1.0 eV.
