= Weyl semimetal =

Concept in quantum physics

Weyl semimetals (/vaɪl/ VILE) are a classification of a electronic state of matter; other states including semiconductors, metals, and semimetals; whose quasiparticle excitation is the Weyl fermion. The Weyl fermion plays a crucial role in quantum field theory but has not been observed as a fundamental particle in vacuum. In these materials, electrons have a linear energy-momentum relation, making them a solid-state analogue of relativistic massless particles. The Weyl fermions observed in Weyl semimetals arise from features in the electronic band structure enforced by time-reversal symmetry and spatial symmetry.

== Theoretical predictions ==
Weyl fermions are massless chiral fermions embodying the mathematical concept of a Weyl spinor. Weyl spinors in turn play an important role in quantum field theory and the Standard Model, where they are a building block for fermions in quantum field theory. Weyl spinors are a solution to the Dirac equation derived by Hermann Weyl, called the Weyl equation. For example, one-half of a charged Dirac fermion of a definite chirality is a Weyl fermion.

Weyl fermions may be realized as emergent quasiparticles in a low-energy condensed matter system. This prediction was first proposed by Conyers Herring in 1937, in the context of electronic band structures of solid state systems such as electronic crystals. Topological materials in the vicinity of band inversion transition became a primary target in search of topologically protected bulk electronic band crossings.

The first (non-electronic) liquid state which is suggested, has similarly emergent but neutral excitation and theoretically interpreted superfluid's chiral anomaly as observation of Fermi points is in Helium-3 A superfluid phase. Crystalline tantalum arsenide (TaAs) is the first discovered topological Weyl fermion semimetal which exhibits topological surface Fermi arcs where Weyl fermion is electrically charged along the line of original suggestion by Herring. An electronic Weyl fermion is not only charged but stable at room temperature where there is no such superfluid or liquid state known.

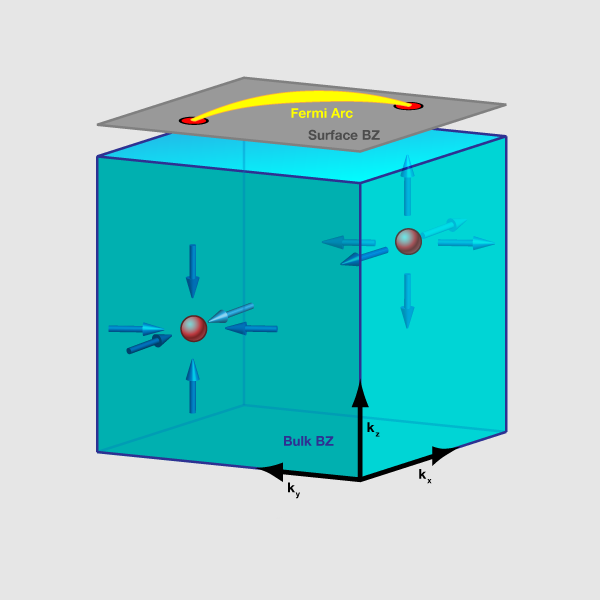
A schematic of the Weyl semimetal state, which include the Weyl nodes and the Fermi arcs. The Weyl nodes are momentum space monopoles and anti-monopoles. The sketch is adapted from Ref.

== Experimental observation ==
A Weyl semimetal is a solid state crystal whose low energy excitations are Weyl fermions that carry electrical charge even at room temperatures. A Weyl semimetal enables realization of Weyl fermions in electronic systems. It is a topologically nontrivial phase of matter, together with Helium-3 A superfluid phase, that broadens the topological classification beyond topological insulators. The Weyl fermions at zero energy correspond to points of bulk band degeneracy, the Weyl nodes (or Fermi points) that are separated in momentum space. Weyl fermions have distinct chiralities, either left handed or right handed.

In a Weyl semimetal crystal, the chiralities associated with the Weyl nodes (Fermi points) can be understood as topological charges, leading to monopoles and anti-monopoles of Berry curvature in momentum space, which (the splitting) serve as the topological invariant of this phase. Comparable to the Dirac fermions in graphene or on the surface of topological insulators, Weyl fermions in a Weyl semimetal are the most robust electrons and do not depend on symmetries except the translation symmetry of the crystal lattice. Hence the Weyl fermion quasiparticles in a Weyl semimetal possess a high degree of mobility. Due to the nontrivial topology, a Weyl semimetal is expected to demonstrate Fermi arc electron states on its surface. These arcs are discontinuous or disjoint segments of a two dimensional Fermi contour, which are terminated onto the projections of the Weyl fermion nodes on the surface. A 2012 theoretical investigation of superfluid Helium-3 suggested Fermi arcs in neutral superfluids.

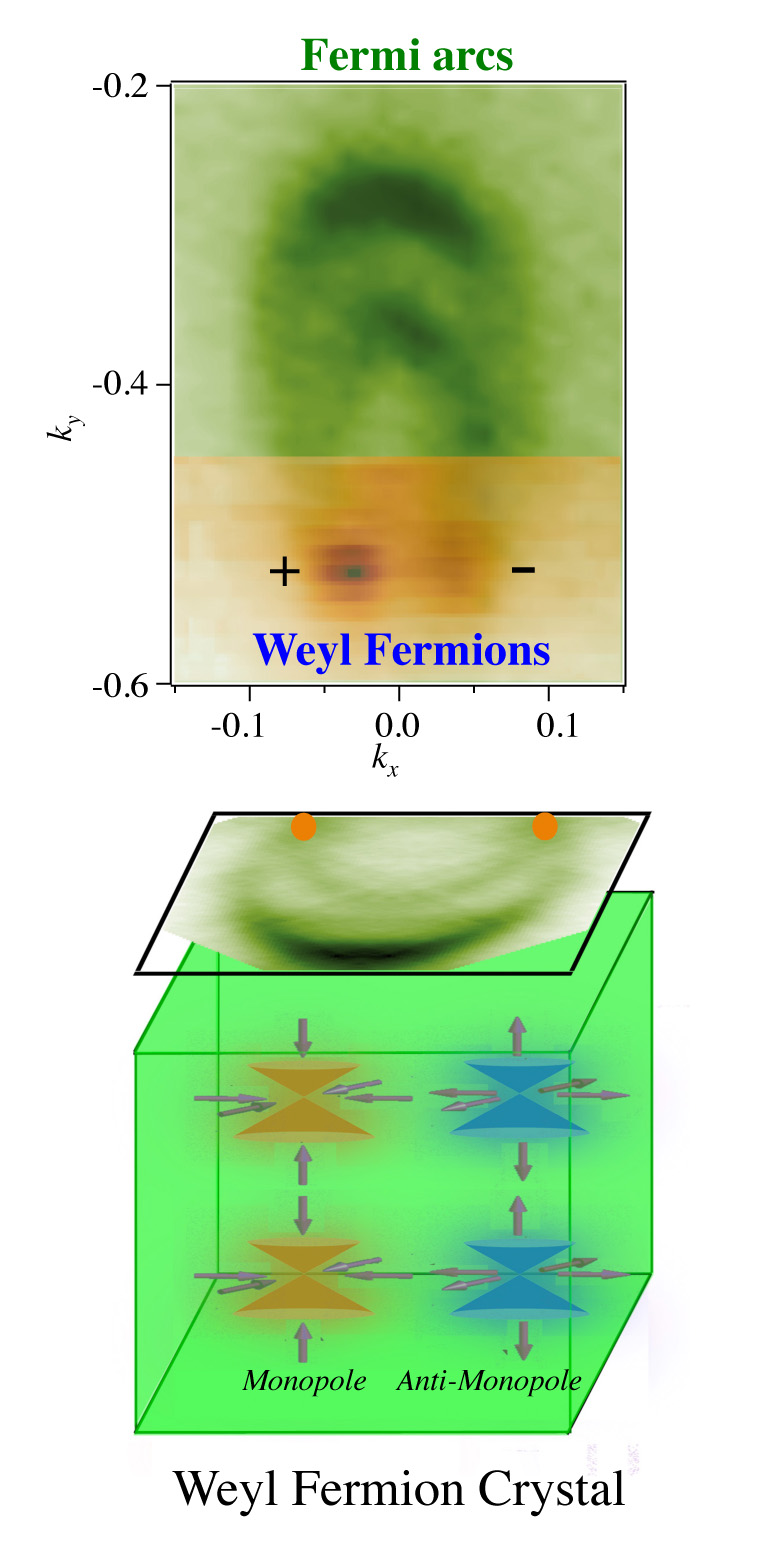
A detector image (top) signals the existence of Weyl fermion nodes and the Fermi arcs. The plus and minus signs note the particle's chirality. A schematic (bottom) shows the way Weyl fermions inside a crystal can be thought as monopole and antimonopole in momentum space. (Image art by Su-Yang Xu and M. Zahid Hasan)

On 16 July 2015 the first experimental observations of Weyl fermion semimetal and topological Fermi arcs in an inversion symmetry-breaking single crystal material tantalum arsenide (TaAs) were made. Both Weyl fermions and Fermi arc surface states were observed using direct electronic imaging using ARPES, which established its topological character for the first time. This discovery was built upon previous theoretical predictions proposed in November 2014 by a team led by Bangladeshi scientist M Zahid Hasan.

Weyl points (Fermi points) were also observed in non-electronic systems such as photonic crystals, in fact even before their experimental observation in electronic systems and Helium-3 superfluid quasiparticle spectrum (neutral fermions). Note that while these systems are different from electronic condensed matter systems, the basic physics is very similar.

== Crystal growth, structure and morphology ==
TaAs is the first discovered Weyl semimetal (conductor). Large-size (~1 cm), high-quality TaAs single crystals can be obtained by chemical vapor transport method using iodine as the transport agent.

TaAs crystallizes in a body-centered tetragonal unit cell with lattice constants a = 3.44 Å and c = 11.64 Å and space group I41md (No. 109). Ta and As atoms are six coordinated to each other. This structure lacks a horizontal mirror plane and thus inversion symmetry, which is essential to realize Weyl semimetal.

TaAs single crystals have shiny facets, which can be divided into three groups: the two truncated surfaces are {001}, the trapezoid or isosceles triangular surfaces are {101}, and the rectangular ones {112}. TaAs belongs to point group 4mm, the equivalent {101} and {112} planes should form a ditetragonal appearance. The observed morphology can be vary of degenerated cases of the ideal form. Beside the initial discovery of TaAs as Weyl semimetal, many other materials such as Co_{2}TiGe, MoTe_{2}, WTe_{2}, LaAlGe and PrAlGe have been identified to exhibit Weyl semimetallic behavior.

== Applications ==
The Weyl fermions in the bulk and the Fermi arcs on the surfaces of Weyl semimetals are of interest in physics and materials technology. The high mobility, chiral transport, and long carrier lifetime of charged Weyl fermions may find use in electronics and computing.

In 2017, a research team from Vienna University of Technology carrying out experimental work to develop new materials, and a team at Rice University carrying out theoretical work, have produced material which they term Weyl–Kondo semimetals.

A group of international researchers led by a team from Boston College discovered in 2019 that the Weyl semimetal Tantalum Arsenide delivers the largest intrinsic conversion of light to electricity of any material, more than ten times larger than previously achieved.

2D Weyl semimetals are spin-polarized analogues of graphene that promise access to topological properties of Weyl fermions in (2+1)-dim spacetime. In 2024, an intrinsic 2D Weyl semimetal with spin-polarized Weyl cones and topological Fermi string edge states was discovered in epitaxial monolayer bismuthene by a team from University of Missouri, National Cheng Kung University, and Oak Ridge National Laboratory.

== See also ==
- Dirac cone
- Dirac matter
- Topological insulator
