= Fermi arc =

Phenomenon of unconventional superconductors

In the field of unconventional superconductivity, a Fermi arc is a phenomenon visible in the pseudogap state of a superconductor. Seen in momentum space, part of the space exhibits a gap in the density of states, like in a superconductor. This starts at the antinodal points, and spreads through momentum space when lowering the temperature until everywhere is gapped and the sample is superconducting. The area in momentum space that remains ungapped is called the Fermi arc.

Fermi arcs also appear in some materials with topological properties such as Weyl semimetals where they represent a surface projection of a two dimensional Fermi contour and are terminated onto the projections of the Weyl fermion nodes on the surface.

== See also ==
- Fermi surface
