= Cadmium arsenide =

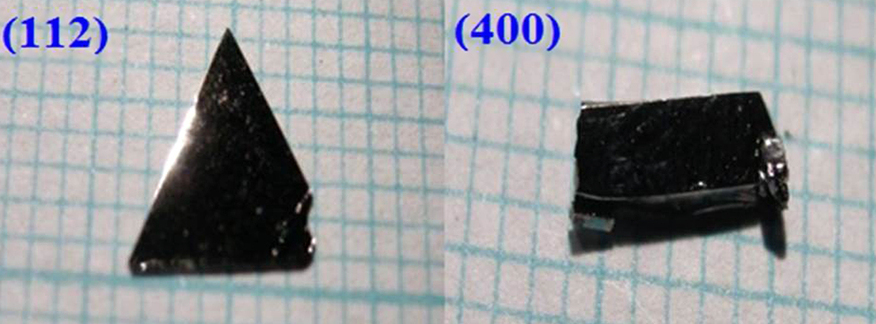
- Cd_{3}As_{2} crystals with (112) and (400) orientations

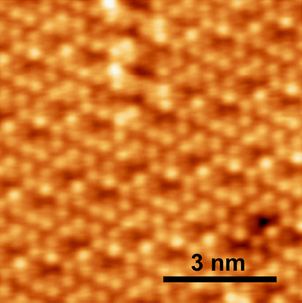
- STM image of the (112) surface

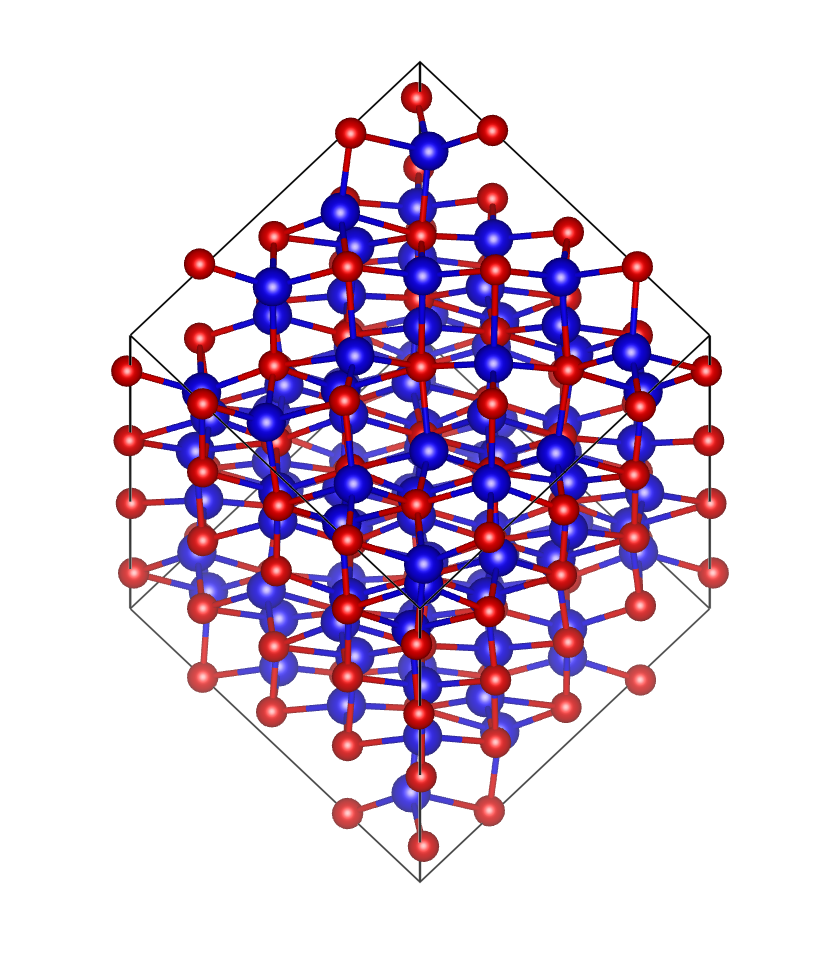
- Cd_{3}As_{2} (112) surface

Names
- Other names Tricadmium diarsenide

Identifiers
CAS Number	12006-15-4
3D model (JSmol)	Interactive image
ChemSpider	10678197
ECHA InfoCard	100.031.336
EC Number	234-484-1
PubChem CID	6391215
CompTox Dashboard (EPA)	DTXSID70893709
- InChI: InChI=1/2As.3Cd/q2*-3;3*+2 Key: PYIKGNIRLAMTQG-UHFFFAOYAS
- SMILES: [Cd+2].[Cd+2].[Cd+2].[As-3].[As-3]

Properties
Chemical formula	Cd_{3}As_{2}
Molar mass	487.08 g/mol
Appearance	solid, dark grey
Density	3.031
Melting point	716 °C (1,321 °F; 989 K)
Solubility in water	decomposes in water

Structure
Crystal structure	Tetragonal, tI208
Space group	I4_{1}/acd, No. 142-2
Lattice constant	a = 1.26512(3) nm, c = 2.54435(4) nm

Hazards
- GHS labelling
Pictograms	(GHS06: Toxic) (GHS07: Exclamation mark) (GHS08: Health hazard) (GHS09: Environmental hazard)
Signal word	Danger
Hazard statements	H301, H312, H330, H350, H410
Precautionary statements	P201, P202, P260, P264, P270, P271, P273, P280, P281, P284, P301+P310, P302+P352, P304+P340, P308+P313, P310, P311, P312, P320, P321, P330, P363, P391, P403+P233, P405, P501
NFPA 704 (fire diamond)	4 1 0 W
- Lethal dose or concentration (LD, LC)
LD_{50} (median dose)	no data
- NIOSH (US health exposure limits)
PEL (Permissible)	[1910.1027] TWA 0.005 mg/m^{3} (as Cd)
REL (Recommended)	Ca
IDLH (Immediate danger)	Ca [9 mg/m^{3} (as Cd)]
- Except where otherwise noted, data are given for materials in their standard state (at 25 °C [77 °F], 100 kPa). Infobox references

Cadmium arsenide (Cd_{3}As_{2}) is an inorganic semimetal in the II-V family. It exhibits the Nernst effect.

== Properties ==
=== Thermal ===
Cd_{3}As_{2} dissociates between 220 and 280 °C according to the reaction

2 Cd_{3}As_{2}(s) → 6 Cd(g) + As_{4}(g)

An energy barrier was found for the nonstoichiometric vaporization of arsenic due to the irregularity of the partial pressures with temperature. The range of the energy gap is from 0.5 to 0.6 eV. Cd_{3}As_{2} melts at 716 °C and changes phase at 615 °C/

=== Phase transition ===
Pure cadmium arsenide undergoes several phase transitions at high temperatures, making phases labeled α (stable), α', α" (metastable), and β. At 593° the polymorphic transition α → β occurs.

α-Cd_{3}As_{2} ↔ α'-Cd_{3}As_{2} occurs at ~500 K.
α'-Cd_{3}As_{2} ↔ α'-Cd_{3}As_{2} occurs at ~742 K and is a regular first order phase transition with marked hysteresis loop.
α"-Cd_{3}As_{2} ↔ β-Cd_{3}As_{2} occurs at 868 K.

Single crystal x-ray diffraction was used to determine the lattice parameters of Cd_{3}As_{2} between 23 and 700 °C. Transition α → α′ occurs slowly and therefore is most likely an intermediate phase. Transition α′ → α″ occurs much faster than α → α′ and has very small thermal hysteresis. This transition results in a change in the fourfold axis of the tetragonal cell, causing crystal twinning. The width of the loop is independent of the rate of heating although it becomes narrower after several temperature cycles.

=== Electronic ===
The compound cadmium arsenide has a lower vapor pressure (0.8 atm) than both cadmium and arsenic separately. Cadmium arsenide does not decompose when it is vaporized and re-condensed. Carrier Concentration in Cd_{3}As_{2} are usually (1–4)×10^{18} electrons/cm^{3}. Despite having high carrier concentrations, the electron mobilities are also very high (up to 10,000 cm^{2}/(V·s) at room temperature).

In 2014 Cd_{3}As_{2} was shown to be a semimetal material analogous to graphene that exists in a 3D form that should be much easier to shape into electronic devices. Three-dimensional (3D) topological Dirac semimetals (TDSs) are bulk analogues of graphene that also exhibit non-trivial topology in its electronic structure that shares similarities with topological insulators. Moreover, a TDS can potentially be driven into other exotic phases (such as Weyl semimetals, axion insulators and topological superconductors), Angle-resolved photoemission spectroscopy revealed a pair of 3D Dirac fermions in Cd_{3}As_{2}. Compared with other 3D TDSs, for example, β-cristobalite BiO_{2} and Na3Bi, Cd_{3}As_{2} is stable and has much higher Fermi velocities. In situ doping was used to tune its Fermi energy.

=== Conducting ===
Cadmium arsenide is a II-V semiconductor showing degenerate n-type semiconductor intrinsic conductivity with a large mobility, low effective mass and highly non parabolic conduction band, or a Narrow-gap semiconductor. It displays an inverted band structure, and the optical energy gap, e_{g}, is less than 0. When deposited by thermal evaporation (deposition), cadmium arsenide displayed the Schottky (thermionic emission) and Poole–Frenkel effect at high electric fields.

=== Magnetoresistance ===
Cadmium Arsenide shows very strong quantum oscillations in resistance even at the relatively high temperature of 100K. This makes it useful for testing cryomagnetic systems as the presence of such a strong signal is a clear indicator of function.

== Preparation ==
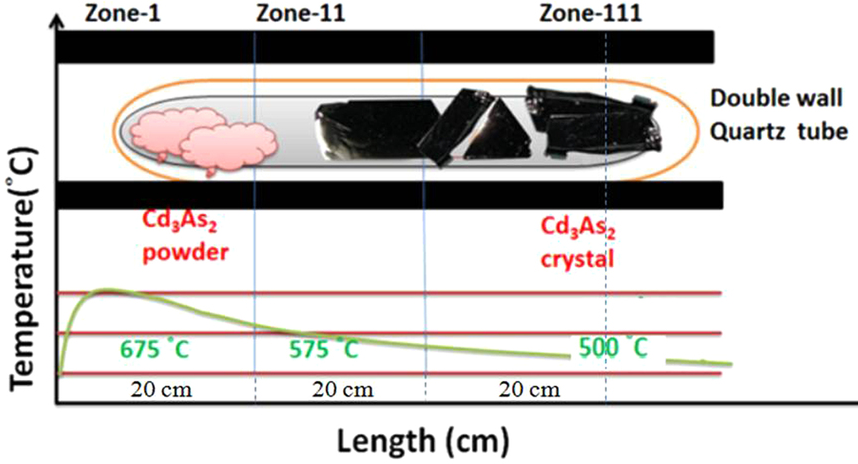
Schematic of the vapor growth of Cd_{3}As_{2} crystals using an alumina furnace.

Cadmium arsenide can be prepared as amorphous semiconductive glass. According to Hiscocks and Elliot, the preparation of cadmium arsenide was made from cadmium metal, which had a purity of 6 N from Kock-Light Laboratories Limited. Hoboken supplied β-arsenic with a purity of 99.999%. Stoichiometric proportions of the elements cadmium and arsenic were heated together. Separation was difficult and lengthy due to the ingots sticking to the silica and breaking. Liquid encapsulated Stockbarger growth was created. Crystals are pulled from volatile melts in liquid encapsulation. The melt is covered by a layer of inert liquid, usually B_{2}O_{3}, and an inert gas pressure greater than the equilibrium vapor pressure is applied. This eliminates the evaporation from the melt which allows seeding and pulling to occur through the B_{2}O_{3} layer.

== Crystal structure ==
The unit cell of Cd_{3}As_{2} is tetragonal with either primitive or body-centered centering depending on the polymorph. The arsenic ions are cubic close packed and the cadmium ions are tetrahedrally coordinated. The vacant tetrahedral sites provoked research by von Stackelberg and Paulus (1935), who determined the primary structure. Each arsenic ion is surrounded by cadmium ions at six of the eight corners of a distorted cube and the two vacant sites were at the diagonals.

The crystalline structure of cadmium arsenide is very similar to that of zinc phosphide (Zn_{3}P_{2}), zinc arsenide (Zn_{3}As_{2}) and cadmium phosphide (Cd_{3}P_{2}). These compounds of the Zn-Cd-P-As quaternary system exhibit full continuous solid solution.

== Nernst effect ==
Cadmium arsenide is used in infrared detectors using the Nernst effect, and in thin-film dynamic pressure sensors. It can be also used to make magnetoresistors, and in photodetectors.

Cadmium arsenide can be used as a dopant for HgCdTe.
