= Dirac fermion =

Type of fermion

In physics, a Dirac fermion is a spin-½ particle (a fermion) which is different from its antiparticle. A vast majority of fermions fall under this category.

== Description ==
In particle physics, all fermions in the standard model have distinct antiparticles (perhaps excepting neutrinos) and hence are Dirac fermions. They are named after Paul Dirac, and can be modeled with the Dirac equation.

A Dirac fermion is equivalent to two Weyl fermions. The counterpart to a Dirac fermion is a Majorana fermion, a particle that must be its own antiparticle.

== Dirac quasi-particles ==
In condensed matter physics, low-energy excitations in graphene and topological insulators, among others, are fermionic quasiparticles described by a pseudo-relativistic Dirac equation.

== See also ==
- Dirac spinor, a wavefunction-like description of a Dirac fermion
- Dirac–Kähler fermion, a geometric formulation of Dirac fermions
- Majorana fermion, an alternate category of fermion, possibly describing neutrinos
- Spinor, mathematical details
- Semi-Dirac fermion, an unusual class of fermions
