= Higher-dimensional gamma matrices =

Gamma matrices for arbitrary Clifford algebras

In mathematical physics, higher-dimensional gamma matrices generalize to arbitrary dimension the four-dimensional Gamma matrices of Dirac, which are a mainstay of relativistic quantum mechanics. They are utilized in relativistically invariant wave equations for fermions (such as spinors) in arbitrary space-time dimensions, notably in string theory and supergravity. The Weyl–Brauer matrices provide an explicit construction of higher-dimensional gamma matrices for Weyl spinors. Gamma matrices also appear in generic settings in Riemannian geometry, particularly when a spin structure can be defined.

== Introduction ==
Consider a space-time of dimension d with the flat Minkowski metric,

$$\eta = \|\eta_{a b}\| = \text{diag}(+1, \dots, +1, -1, \dots, -1) ~,$$

with $p$ positive entries, $q$ negative entries, $p + q = d$ and a, b = 0, 1, ..., d − 1. Set N = 2^{⌊1/2d⌋}. The standard Dirac matrices correspond to taking d = N = 4 and p, q = 1, 3 or 3, 1.

In higher (and lower) dimensions, one may define a group, the gamma group, behaving in the same fashion as the Dirac matrices. More precisely, if one selects a basis $\{e_a\}$ for the (complexified) Clifford algebra $\mathrm{Cl}_{p,q}(\mathbb{C}) \cong \mathrm{Cl}^\mathbb{C}(p, q)$, then the gamma group generated by $\{\Gamma_a\}$ is isomorphic to the multiplicative subgroup generated by the basis elements $e_a$ (ignoring the additive aspect of the Clifford algebra).

By convention, the gamma group is realized as a collection of matrices, the gamma matrices, although the group definition does not require this. In particular, many important properties, including the C, P and T symmetries do not require a specific matrix representation, and one obtains a clearer definition of chirality in this way. Several matrix representations are possible, some given below, and others in the article on the Weyl–Brauer matrices. In the matrix representation, the spinors are $N$-dimensional, with the gamma matrices acting on the spinors. A detailed construction of spinors is given in the article on Clifford algebra. Jost provides a standard reference for spinors in the general setting of Riemmannian geometry.

== Gamma group ==
Most of the properties of the gamma matrices can be captured by a group, the gamma group. This group can be defined without reference to the real numbers, the complex numbers, or even any direct appeal to the Clifford algebra. The matrix representations of this group then provide a concrete realization that can be used to specify the action of the gamma matrices on spinors. For $(p,q)=(1,3)$ dimensions, the matrix products behave just as the conventional Dirac matrices. The Pauli group is a representation of the gamma group for $(p,q)=(3,0)$ although the Pauli group has more relationships (is less free); see the note about the chiral element below for an example. The quaternions provide a representation for $(p,q)=(0,3).$

The presentation of the gamma group $G = G_{p,q}$ is as follows.

- A neutral element is denoted as $I$.
- The element $i$ with $i^4 = I$ is a stand-in for the complex number $i$; it commutes with all other elements,
- There is a collection of generators $\Gamma_a$ indexed by $a = 0, \ldots, p - 1$ with $\Gamma_a^2 = I~,$
- The remaining generators $\Gamma_a,\ a = p, \ldots, p + q - 1$ obey $\Gamma_a^2 = i^2~,$
- The anticommutator is defined as $\Gamma_a \Gamma_b = i^2 \Gamma_b \Gamma_a$ for $a \ne b ~.$

These generators completely define the gamma group. It can be shown that, for all $x \in G$ that $x^4 = I$ and so $x^{-1} = x^3~.$ Every element $x \in G$ can be uniquely written as a product of a finite number of generators placed in canonical order as

$$x = i^n \Gamma_a\Gamma_b \cdots \Gamma_c$$

with the indexes in ascending order

$$a < b < \cdots < c$$

and $0 \le n \le 3.$ The gamma group is finite, and has at most $2^{p+q+2}$ elements in it.

The gamma group is a 2-group but not a regular p-group. The commutator subgroup (derived subgroup) is $[G, G] = \left\{I, i^2\right\} ~,$ therefore it is not a powerful p-group. In general, 2-groups have a large number of involutions; the gamma group does likewise. Three particular ones are singled out below, as they have a specific interpretation in the context of Clifford algebras, in the context of the representations of the gamma group (where transposition and Hermitian conjugation literally correspond to those actions on matrices), and in physics, where the "main involution" $\alpha$ corresponds to a combined P-symmetry and T-symmetry.

=== Transposition ===
Given elements $\Gamma_i$ of the generating set of the gamma group, the transposition or reversal is given by

$$(\Gamma_a\Gamma_b\cdots\Gamma_c)^\textsf{t} = \Gamma_c\cdots\Gamma_b\Gamma_a$$

If there are $k$ elements $\Gamma_i$ all distinct, then

$$(\Gamma_a\Gamma_b\cdots\Gamma_c)^\textsf{t} = \left(i^2\right)^{\frac{1}{2}k(k-1)}\Gamma_a\Gamma_b\cdots \Gamma_c$$

=== Hermitian conjugation ===
Another automorphism of the gamma group is given by conjugation, defined on the generators as

$$\Gamma_a^\dagger = \begin{cases}
\Gamma_a & \mbox{for } 0 \le a < p \\
i^2\Gamma_a & \mbox{for } p \le a < p + q \\
\end{cases}$$

supplemented with $i^\dagger = i^3$ and $I^\dagger = I.$ For general elements in the group, one takes the transpose: $(ab)^\dagger = b^\dagger a^\dagger~.$ From the properties of transposition, it follows that, for all elements $x\in G$ that either $xx^\dagger = x^\dagger x = I$ or that $xx^\dagger = x^\dagger x = i^2 ~,$ that is, all elements are either Hermitian or unitary.

If one interprets the $p$ dimensions as being "time-like", and the $q$ dimensions as being "space-like", then this corresponds to P-symmetry in physics. That this is the "correct" identification follows from the conventional Dirac matrices, where $\gamma_0$ is associated with the time-like direction, and the $\gamma_i$ the spatial directions, with the "conventional" (+−−−) metric. Other metric and representational choices suggest other interpretations.

=== Main involution ===
The main involution is the map that "flips" the generators: $\alpha(\Gamma_a) = i^2\Gamma_a$ but leaves $i$ alone: $\alpha(i) = i ~.$ This map corresponds to the combined P-symmetry and T-symmetry in physics; all directions are reversed.

=== Chiral element ===
Define the chiral element $\omega \equiv \Gamma_\mathrm{chir}$ as

$$\omega = \Gamma_\mathrm{chir} = \Gamma_0\Gamma_1\cdots\Gamma_{d-1}$$

where $d = p + q$. The chiral element commutes with the generators as

$$\Gamma_a\omega = \left(i^2\right)^{d-1}\omega \Gamma_a$$

It squares to

$$\omega^2 = \left(i^2\right)^{q+\frac{1}{2}d(d-1)}$$

For the Dirac matrices, the chiral element corresponds to $\gamma_5 ~,$ thus its name, as it plays an important role in distinguishing the chirality of spinors.

For the Pauli group, the chiral element is $\sigma_1\sigma_2\sigma_3 = i$ whereas for the gamma group $G_{3,0}$, one cannot deduce any such relationship for $\Gamma_1\Gamma_2\Gamma_3$ other than that it squares to $i^2~.$ This is an example of where a representation may have more identities than the represented group. For the quaternions, which provide a representation of $G_{0,3}$ the chiral element is $ijk = i^2~.$

=== Charge conjugation ===
None of the above automorphisms (transpose, conjugation, main involution) are inner automorphisms; that is they cannot be represented in the form $CxC^{-1}$ for some existing element $C$ in the gamma group, as presented above. Charge conjugation requires extending the gamma group with two new elements; by convention, these are

$$C_{+}\Gamma_a C_{+}^{-1} = \Gamma_a^\textsf{t}$$

and

$$C_{-}\Gamma_a C_{-}^{-1} = i^2\Gamma_a^\textsf{t}$$

The above relations are not sufficient to define a group; $C^2$ and other products are undetermined.

=== Matrix representation ===
The gamma group has a matrix representation given by complex $N \times N$ matrices with $N = 2^{\left\lfloor \frac{1}{2}d\right\rfloor}$ and $d = p + q$ and $\lfloor x \rfloor$ the floor function, the largest integer less than or equal to $x.$ The group presentation for the matrices can be written compactly in terms of the anticommutator relation from the Clifford algebra Cℓ_{p,q}(R)

$$\{ \Gamma_a ~,~ \Gamma_b \} = \Gamma_a\Gamma_b + \Gamma_b\Gamma_a = 2 \eta_{a b} I_N ~,$$

where the matrix I_{N} is the identity matrix in N dimensions. Transposition and Hermitian conjugation correspond to their usual meaning on matrices.

== Charge conjugation ==
For the remainder of this article, it is assumed that $p = 1$ and so $q = d - 1$. That is, the Clifford algebra Cℓ_{1,d−1}(R) is assumed. (Note: It is possible and even likely that many or most of the formulas and tables in this and later sections hold in the general case; however, this has not been verified. This and later sections were originally written with the assumption of a (1,d−1) metric.) In this case, the gamma matrices have the following property under Hermitian conjugation,

$$\begin{align}
\Gamma_0^\dagger &= +\Gamma_0 ~, &
\Gamma_a^\dagger &= -\Gamma_a ~(a = 1, \dots, d - 1) ~.
\end{align}$$

Transposition will be denoted with a minor change of notation, by mapping $\Gamma_a^\textsf{t} \mapsto \Gamma_a^\textsf{T}$ where the element on the left is the abstract group element, and the one on the right is the literal matrix transpose.

As before, the generators Γ_{a}, −Γ_{a}^{T}, Γ_{a}^{T} all generate the same group (the generated groups are all isomorphic; the operations are still involutions). However, since the Γ_{a} are now matrices, it becomes plausible to ask whether there is a matrix that can act as a similarity transformation that embodies the automorphisms. In general, such a matrix can be found. By convention, there are two of interest; in the physics literature, both referred to as charge conjugation matrices. Explicitly, these are

$$\begin{align}
C_{(+)} \Gamma_a C_{(+)}^{-1} &= + \Gamma_a^\textsf{T} \\
C_{(-)} \Gamma_a C_{(-)}^{-1} &= - \Gamma_a^\textsf{T} ~.
\end{align}$$

They can be constructed as real matrices in various dimensions, as the following table shows. In even dimension both $C_\pm$ exist, in odd dimension just one.

d	$C^*_{(+)} = C_{(+)}$	$C^*_{(-)} = C_{(-)}$
$2$	$C^\textsf{T}_{(+)} = C_{(+)};~~~C^2_{(+)} = 1$	$C^\textsf{T}_{(-)} = -C_{(-)};~~~C^2_{(-)} = -1$
$3$		$C^\textsf{T}_{(-)} = -C_{(-)};~~~C^2_{(-)} = -1$
$4$	$C^\textsf{T}_{(+)} = -C_{(+)};~~~C^2_{(+)} = -1$	$C^\textsf{T}_{(-)} = -C_{(-)};~~~C^2_{(-)} = -1$
$5$	$C^\textsf{T}_{(+)} = -C_{(+)};~~~C^2_{(+)} = -1$	
$6$	$C^\textsf{T}_{(+)} = -C_{(+)};~~~C^2_{(+)} = -1$	$C^\textsf{T}_{(-)} = C_{(-)};~~~C^2_{(-)} = 1$
$7$		$C^\textsf{T}_{(-)} = C_{(-)};~~~C^2_{(-)} = 1$
$8$	$C^\textsf{T}_{(+)} = C_{(+)};~~~C^2_{(+)} = 1$	$C^\textsf{T}_{(-)} = C_{(-)};~~~C^2_{(-)} = 1$
$9$	$C^\textsf{T}_{(+)} = C_{(+)};~~~C^2_{(+)} = 1$	
$10$	$C^\textsf{T}_{(+)} = C_{(+)};~~~C^2_{(+)} = 1$	$C^\textsf{T}_{(-)} = -C_{(-)};~~~C^2_{(-)} = -1$
$11$		$C^\textsf{T}_{(-)} = -C_{(-)};~~~C^2_{(-)} = -1$

Note that $C^*_{(\pm)} = C_{(\pm)}$ is a basis choice.

== Symmetry properties ==
We denote a product of gamma matrices by

$$\Gamma_{abc \dotsm} = \Gamma_a \cdot \Gamma_b \cdot \Gamma_c \cdots {}$$

and note that the anti-commutation property allows us to simplify any such sequence to one in which the indices are distinct and increasing. Since distinct $\Gamma_a$ anti-commute this motivates the introduction of an anti-symmetric "average". We introduce the anti-symmetrised products of distinct n-tuples from 0, ..., d − 1:

$$\Gamma_{a_1 \dots a_n} = \frac{1}{n!} \sum_{\pi \in S_n} \epsilon(\pi) \Gamma_{a_{\pi(1)}} \cdots \Gamma_{a_{\pi(n)}} ~,$$

where π runs over all the permutations of n symbols, and ϵ is the alternating character. There are 2^{d} such products, but only N^{2} are independent, spanning the space of N×N matrices.

Typically, Γ_{ab} provide the (bi)spinor representation of the 1/2d(d − 1) generators of the higher-dimensional Lorentz group, SO^{+}(1, d − 1), generalizing the 6 matrices σ^{μν} of the spin representation of the Lorentz group in four dimensions.

For even d, one may further define the hermitian chiral matrix

$$\Gamma_\text{chir} = i^{\frac{d}{2}-1} \Gamma_0 \Gamma_1 \dotsm \Gamma_{d-1} ~,$$

such that {Γ_{chir}, Γ_{a}} = 0 and Γ_{chir}^{2} = 1. (In odd dimensions, such a matrix would commute with all Γ_{a}s and would thus be proportional to the identity, so it is not considered.)

A Γ matrix is called symmetric if

$$( C \Gamma_{a_1 \dotsm a_n} )^\textsf{T} = +( C \Gamma_{a_1 \dotsm a_n} ) ~;$$

otherwise, for a − sign, it is called antisymmetric.

In the previous expression, C can be either $C_{(+)}$ or $C_{(-)}$. In odd dimension, there is no ambiguity, but in even dimension it is better to choose whichever one of $C_{(+)}$ or $C_{(-)}$ allows for Majorana spinors. In d = 6, there is no such criterion and therefore we consider both.

d	C	Symmetric	Antisymmetric
$3$	$C_{(-)}$	$\gamma_{a}$	$I_2$
$4$	$C_{(-)}$	$\gamma_{a} ~,~ \gamma_{a_1 a_2}$	$I_4 ~,~ \gamma_\text{chir} ~,~ \gamma_\text{chir} \gamma_a$
$5$	$C_{(+)}$	$\Gamma_{a_1 a_2}$	$I_4 ~,~ \Gamma_a$
$6$	$C_{(-)}$	$I_8 ~,~ \Gamma_\text{chir} \Gamma_{a_1 a_2} ~,~ \Gamma_{a_1 a_2 a_3}$	$\Gamma_a ~,~ \Gamma_\text{chir}~,~ \Gamma_\text{chir} \Gamma_a ~,~ \Gamma_{a_1 a_2}$
$7$	$C_{(-)}$	$I_8 ~,~ \Gamma_{a_1 a_2 a_3}$	$\Gamma_a ~,~ \Gamma_{a_1 a_2}$
$8$	$C_{(+)}$	$I_{16} ~,~ \Gamma_{a} ~,~ \Gamma_\text{chir} ~,~ \Gamma_\text{chir}\Gamma_{a_1 a_2 a_3} ~,~ \Gamma_{a_1 \dots a_4}$	$\Gamma_\text{chir} \Gamma_a ~,~ \Gamma_{a_1 a_2} ~,~ \Gamma_\text{chir} \Gamma_{a_1 a_2} ~,~ \Gamma_{a_1 a_2 a_3}$
$9$	$C_{(+)}$	$I_{16} ~,~ \Gamma_{a} ~,~ \Gamma_{a_1 \dotsm a_4} ~,~ \Gamma_{a_1 \dotsm a_5}$	$\Gamma_{a_1 a_2} ~,~ \Gamma_{a_1 a_2 a_3}$
$10$	$C_{(-)}$	$\Gamma_{a} ~,~ \Gamma_\text{chir} ~,~ \Gamma_\text{chir} \Gamma_a ~,~ \Gamma_{a_1 a_2} ~,~ \Gamma_\text{chir} \Gamma_{a_1 \dotsm a_4} ~,~ \Gamma_{a_1 \dotsm a_5}$	$I_{32} ~,~ \Gamma_\text{chir} \Gamma_{a_1 a_2} ~,~ \Gamma_{a_1 a_2 a_3} ~,~ \Gamma_{a_1 \dotsm a_4} ~,~ \Gamma_\text{chir} \Gamma_{a_1 a_2 a_3}$
$11$	$C_{(-)}$	$\Gamma_a ~,~ \Gamma_{a_1 a_2} ~,~ \Gamma_{a_1 \dotsm a_5}$	$I_{32} ~,~ \Gamma_{a_1 a_2 a_3} ~,~ \Gamma_{a_1 \dotsm a_4}$

== Identities ==
The proof of the trace identities for gamma matrices hold for all even dimension. One therefore only needs to remember the 4D case and then change the overall factor of 4 to $\operatorname{tr}(I_N)$. For other identities (the ones that involve a contraction), explicit functions of $d$ will appear.

1. $\gamma^\mu\gamma_\mu = d I_N$
2. $\gamma^\mu\gamma^\nu\gamma_\mu = (2 - d) \gamma^\nu$
3. $\gamma^\mu\gamma^\nu\gamma^\rho\gamma_\mu = 2 \gamma^\rho\gamma^\nu + (d - 2) \gamma^\nu\gamma^\rho$
4. $\gamma^\mu\gamma^\nu\gamma^\rho\gamma^\sigma\gamma_\mu = 2 \gamma^\rho\gamma^\sigma\gamma^\nu - 2 \gamma^\nu\gamma^\sigma\gamma^\rho - (d - 2) \gamma^\nu\gamma^\rho\gamma^\sigma$

Even when the number of physical dimensions is four, these more general identities are ubiquitous in loop calculations due to dimensional regularization.

== Example of an explicit construction ==
The Γ matrices can be constructed recursively, first in all even dimensions, d = 2k, and thence in odd ones, 2k + 1.

=== d = 2 ===
Using the Pauli matrices, take

$$\begin{align}
\gamma_0 &= \sigma_1, & \gamma_1 &= -i \sigma_2
\end{align}$$

and one may easily check that the charge conjugation matrices are

$$\begin{align}
C_{(+)} =   \sigma_1 = C_{(+)}^* = s_{(2,+)} C_{(+)}^\textsf{T} &= s_{(2,+)} C_{(+)}^{-1} & s_{(2,+)} &= +1 \\
C_{(-)} = i \sigma_2 = C_{(-)}^* = s_{(2,-)} C_{(-)}^\textsf{T} &= s_{(2,-)} C_{(-)}^{-1} & s_{(2,-)} &= -1~.
\end{align}$$

One may finally define the hermitian chiral γ_{chir} to be

$$\gamma_\text{chir} = \gamma_0 \gamma_1 = \sigma_3 = \gamma_\text{chir}^\dagger ~.$$

=== Generic even d = 2k ===
One may now construct the Γ_{a}, (a = 0, ... , d + 1), matrices and the charge conjugations C_{(±)} in d + 2 dimensions, starting from the γ_{a'} , ( a' = 0, ... , d − 1), and c_{(±)} matrices in d dimensions.

Explicitly,

$$\begin{align}
\Gamma_{a'} &= \gamma_{a'} \otimes \sigma_3 ~~~ \left(a' = 0, \dots, d - 1\right)~, &
\Gamma_{d} &= I \otimes (i \sigma_1) ~, &
\Gamma_{d+1} &= I \otimes (i \sigma_2) ~.
\end{align}$$

One may then construct the charge conjugation matrices,

$$\begin{align}
C_{(+)} &= c_{(-)} \otimes \sigma_1 ~, &
C_{(-)} &= c_{(+)} \otimes (i \sigma_2) ~,
\end{align}$$

with the following properties,

$$\begin{align}
C_{(+)} = C_{(+)}^* = s_{(d+2,+)} C_{(+)}^\textsf{T} &= s_{(d+2,+)} C_{(+)}^{-1} & s_{(d+2,+)} &=  s_{(d,-)} \\
C_{(-)} = C_{(-)}^* = s_{(d+2,-)} C_{(-)}^\textsf{T} &= s_{(d+2,-)} C_{(-)}^{-1} & s_{(d+2,-)} &= -s_{(d,+)} ~.
\end{align}$$

Starting from the sign values for d = 2, s_{(2,+)} = +1 and s_{(2,−)} = −1, one may fix all subsequent signs s_{(d,±)} which have periodicity 8; explicitly, one finds

	$d = 8 k$	$d = 8 k + 2$	$d = 8 k + 4$	$d = 8 k + 6$
$s_{(d,+)}$	+1	+1	−1	−1
$s_{(d,-)}$	+1	−1	−1	+1

Again, one may define the hermitian chiral matrix in d+2 dimensions as

$$\begin{align}
\Gamma_\text{chir} &= \alpha_{d+2} \Gamma_0 \Gamma_1 \dotsm \Gamma_{d+1} = \gamma_\text{chir} \otimes \sigma_3~, &
\alpha_d &= i^{\frac{1}{2}d-1} ~,
\end{align}$$

which is diagonal by construction and transforms under charge conjugation as

$$\begin{align}
C_{(\pm)} \Gamma_\text{chir} C_{(\pm)}^{-1} &= \beta_{d+2} \Gamma_\text{chir}^\textsf{T}~, &
\beta_d &= (-)^{\frac{1}{2}d(d-1)} ~.
\end{align}$$

It is thus evident that {Γ_{chir} , Γ_{a}} = 0. Once a permutation is applied to make the +1 and -1 eigenvalues of the chiral matrix consecutive, this choice becomes the direct analogue of the chiral basis in four dimensions.

=== Generic odd d = 2k + 1 ===
Consider the previous construction for d − 1 (which is even) and simply take all Γ_{a} (a = 0, ..., d − 2) matrices, to which append its iΓ_{chir} ≡ Γ_{d−1}. (The i is required in order to yield an antihermitian matrix, and extend into the spacelike metric).

Finally, compute the charge conjugation matrix: choose between $C_{(+)}$ and $C_{(-)}$, in such a way that Γ_{d−1} transforms as all the other Γ matrices. Explicitly, require

$$C_{(s)} \Gamma_\text{chir} C_{(s)}^{-1} = \beta_{d} \Gamma_\text{chir}^\textsf{T} = s \Gamma_\text{chir}^\textsf{T} ~.$$

As the dimension d ranges, patterns typically repeat themselves with period 8. (cf. the Clifford algebra clock.)

== See also ==
- Weyl–Brauer matrices
- Dirac spinor
- Clifford module

== General reading ==
- Brauer, Richard; Weyl, Hermann (1935). "Spinors in n dimensions". Am. J. Math. 57 (2): 425–449. doi:10.2307/2371218. JFM 61.1025.06. JSTOR 2371218. Zbl 0011.24401.
- Pais, Abraham (1962). "On Spinors in n Dimensions". Journal of Mathematical Physics. 3 (6): 1135–1139. Bibcode:1962JMP.....3.1135P. doi:10.1063/1.1703856.
- Gliozzi, F.; Scherk, Joel; Olive, D. (1977). "Supersymmetry, supergravity theories and the dual spinor model" (PDF). Nuclear Physics B. 122 (2): 253. Bibcode:1977NuPhB.122..253G. doi:10.1016/0550-3213(77)90206-1.
- Kennedy, A. D. (1981). "Clifford algebras in 2ω dimensions". Journal of Mathematical Physics. 22 (7): 1330–1337. Bibcode:1981JMP....22.1330K. doi:10.1063/1.525069.
- de Wit, Bryce and Smith, J. (1986). Field Theory in Particle Physics (North-Holland Personal Library), Volume 1, Paperback, Appendix E (Archived from original), ISBN 978-0444869999
- Murayama, H. (2007). "Notes on Clifford Algebra and Spin(N) Representations"
- Pietro Giuseppe Frè (2012). "Gravity, a Geometrical Course: Volume 1: Development of the Theory and Basic Physical Applications." Springer-Verlag. ISBN 9400753608. See pp 315ff.
