= Plate trick =

Mathematic demonstration of rotations in 3-dimensions

In mathematics and physics, the plate trick, also known as Dirac's string trick (after Paul Dirac, who introduced and popularized it), the belt trick, or the Balinese cup trick (it appears in the Balinese candle dance), is any of several demonstrations of the idea that rotating an object with strings attached to it by 360 degrees does not return the system to its original state, while a second rotation of 360 degrees, a total rotation of 720 degrees, does. Mathematically, it is a demonstration of the theorem that the 3D rotation group SO(3) is not simply connected but has a fundamental group of order 2; thus its double cover SU(2) is simply connected. To say that SU(2) double-covers SO(3) essentially means that the unit quaternions represent the group of rotations twice over. A detailed, intuitive, yet semi-formal articulation can be found in the article on tangloids.

== Demonstrations ==
Resting a small plate flat on the palm, it is possible to perform two rotations of one's hand while keeping the plate upright. After the first rotation of the hand, the arm will be twisted, but after the second rotation it will end in the original position. To do this, the hand makes one rotation passing over the elbow, twisting the arm, and then another rotation passing under the elbow untwists it. The plate trick can also be performed repeatedly.

In mathematical physics, the trick illustrates the quaternionic mathematics behind the spin of spinors. As with the plate trick, these particles' spins return to their original state only after two full rotations, not after one.

=== The belt trick ===
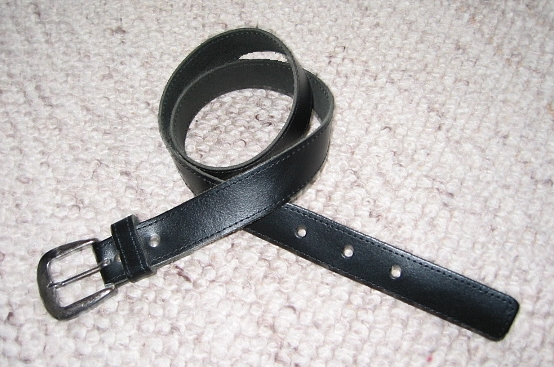
Leather belt with frame buckle

Dirac belt trick simulation

The same phenomenon can be demonstrated using a leather belt with an ordinary frame buckle, whose prong serves as a pointer. The end opposite the buckle is clamped so it cannot move. The belt is extended without a twist and the buckle is kept horizontal while being turned clockwise one complete turn (360°), as evidenced by watching the prong. The belt will then appear twisted, and no maneuvering of the buckle that keeps it horizontal and pointed in the same direction can undo the twist. Obviously a 360° turn counterclockwise would undo the twist. The surprise element of the trick is that a second 360° turn in the clockwise direction, while apparently making the belt even more twisted, does allow the belt to be returned to its untwisted state by maneuvering the buckle under the clamped end while always keeping the buckle horizontal and pointed in the same direction.

Mathematically, the belt serves as a record, as one moves along it, of how the buckle was transformed from its original position, with the belt untwisted, to its final rotated position. The clamped end always represents the null rotation. The trick demonstrates that a path in rotation space (SO(3)) that produces a 360 degree rotation is not homotopic to a null rotation, but a path that produces a double rotation (720°) is null-homotopic.

The belt trick has been theoretically constructed in 1-d Classical Heisenberg model as a breather solution.

== See also ==
- Anti-twister mechanism
- Spin–statistics theorem
- Orientation entanglement
- Tangloids
- Spin-1/2
