= Orientation entanglement =

Spinor topology

A single point in space can spin continuously without becoming tangled. Notice that after a 360 degree rotation, the spiral flips between clockwise and counterclockwise orientations. It returns to its original configuration after spinning a full 720 degrees.

In mathematics and physics, the notion of orientation entanglement is sometimes used to develop intuition relating to the geometry of spinors or alternatively as a concrete realization of the failure of the special orthogonal groups to be simply connected.

== Elementary description ==
Spatial vectors alone are not sufficient to describe the properties of rotations in space.

A set of 96 fibers are anchored to the environment at one end and to a rotating sphere at the other. The sphere can rotate indefinitely without the fibers becoming tangled.

A coffee cup with bands attached to its handle and opposite side.

Consider the following example. A coffee cup is suspended in a room by a pair of elastic rubber bands fixed to the walls of the room. The cup is rotated by its handle through a full twist of 360°, so that the handle is brought all the way around the central vertical axis of the cup and back to its original position.

Note that after this rotation, the cup has been returned to its original orientation, but that its orientation with respect to the walls is twisted. In other words, if we lower the coffee cup to the floor of the room, the two bands will coil around each other in one full twist of a double helix. This is an example of orientation entanglement: the new orientation of the coffee cup embedded in the room is not actually the same as the old orientation, as evidenced by the twisting of the rubber bands. In other words, the orientation of the coffee cup has become entangled with the orientation of the surrounding walls.

The coffee cup vector. After a full rotation, the vector is unchanged.

Clearly the geometry of spatial vectors alone is insufficient to express the orientation entanglement (the twist of the rubber bands). Consider drawing a vector across the cup. A full rotation will move the vector around so that the new orientation of the vector is the same as the old one. The vector alone doesn't know that the coffee cup is entangled with the walls of the room.

In fact, the coffee cup is inextricably entangled. There is no way to untwist the bands without rotating the cup. However, consider what happens instead when the cup is rotated, not through just one 360° turn, but two 360° turns for a total rotation of 720°. Then if the cup is lowered to the floor, the two rubber bands coil around each other in two full twists of a double helix. If the cup is now brought up through the center of one coil of this helix, and passed onto its other side, the twist disappears. The bands are no longer coiled about each other, even though no additional rotation had to be performed. (This experiment is more easily performed with a ribbon or belt. See below.)

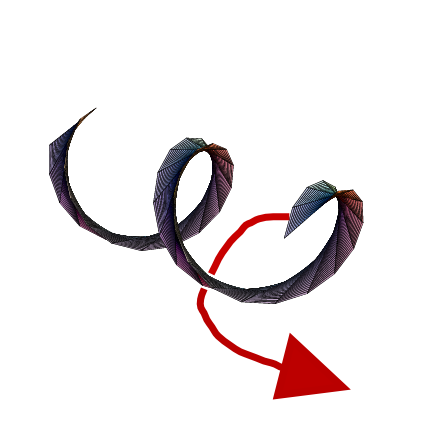
Untwisting a ribbon without rotation.

Thus, whereas the orientation of the cup was twisted with respect to the walls after a rotation of only 360°, it was no longer twisted after a rotation of 720°. By only considering the vector attached to the cup, it is impossible to distinguish between these two cases, however. It is only when we attach a spinor to the cup that we can distinguish between the twisted and untwisted case.

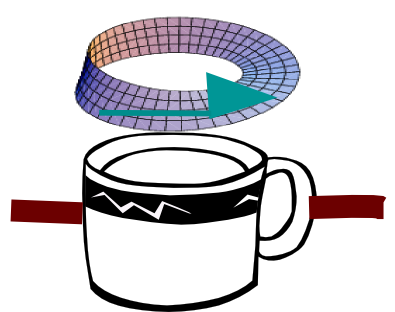
A spinor.

In this situation, a spinor is a sort of polarized vector. In the adjacent diagram, a spinor can be represented as a vector whose head is a flag lying on one side of a Möbius strip, pointing inward. Initially, suppose that the flag is on top of the strip as shown. As the coffee cup is rotated it carries the spinor, and its flag, along the strip. If the cup is rotated through 360°, the spinor returns to the initial position, but the flag is now underneath the strip, pointing outward. It takes another 360° rotation in order to return the flag to its original orientation.

A detailed bridge between the above, and the formal mathematics can be found in the article on tangloids.

== Formal details ==
In three dimensions, the problem illustrated above corresponds to the fact that the Lie group SO(3) is not simply connected. Mathematically, one can tackle this problem by exhibiting the special unitary group, SU(2), which is also the spin group in three Euclidean dimensions, as a double cover of SO(3). If X = (x_{1}, x_{2}, x_{3}) is a vector in R^{3}, then we identify X with the 2 × 2 matrix with complex entries

$$X = \left(\begin{matrix} x_1 & x_2 - ix_3 \\ x_2 + ix_3 & -x_1 \end{matrix}\right)$$

Note that −det(X) gives the square of the Euclidean length of X regarded as a vector, and that X is a trace-free, or better, trace-zero Hermitian matrix.

The unitary group acts on X via

$$X \mapsto MXM^\dagger$$

where M ∈ SU(2). Note that, since M is unitary,

$\det\left(MXM^\dagger\right) = \det(X)$, and
$MXM^\dagger$ is trace-zero Hermitian.

Hence SU(2) acts via rotation on the vectors X. Conversely, since any change of basis which sends trace-zero Hermitian matrices to trace-zero Hermitian matrices must be unitary, it follows that every rotation also lifts to SU(2). However, each rotation is obtained from a pair of elements M and −M of SU(2). Hence SU(2) is a double-cover of SO(3). Furthermore, SU(2) is easily seen to be itself simply connected by realizing it as the group of unit quaternions, a space homeomorphic to the 3-sphere.

A unit quaternion has the cosine of half the rotation angle as its scalar part and the sine of half the rotation angle multiplying a unit vector along some rotation axis (here assumed fixed) as its vector part (also called imaginary part, see Euler–Rodrigues formula). If the initial orientation of a rigid body (with unentangled connections to its fixed surroundings) is identified with a unit quaternion having zero vector part and +1 for the scalar part, then after one complete rotation (2π rad) the vector part returns to zero and the scalar part has become −1 (entangled). After two complete rotations (4π rad) the vector part again returns to zero and the scalar part returns to +1 (unentangled), completing the cycle.

== See also ==
- Plate trick
- Tangloids
