= Eigenspinor =

Vectors representing a particle spin state

In quantum mechanics, eigenspinors are basis vectors representing the general spin state of a particle. For a single spin 1/2 particle, they can be defined as the eigenvectors of the Pauli matrices. As such, they are vectors mathematically but physics convention (Note: for example as described at Pseudovector under "Details") distinguishes vectors from spinors by their transformation behavior.

== General eigenspinors ==
In quantum mechanics, the spin of a particle or collection of particles is quantized. In particular, all particles have either half integer or integer spin. In the most general case, the eigenspinors for a system can be quite complicated. If you have a collection of the Avogadro number of particles, each one with two (or more) possible spin states, writing down a complete set of eigenspinors would not be practically possible. However, eigenspinors are very useful when dealing with the spins of a very small number of particles.

== The spin 1/2 particle ==
The simplest and most illuminating example of eigenspinors is for a single spin 1/2 particle. A particle's spin has three components, corresponding to the three spatial dimensions: $S_x$, $S_y$, and $S_z$. For a spin 1/2 particle, there are only two possible eigenstates of spin: spin up, and spin down. Spin up is denoted as the column matrix:
$$\chi_+ = \begin{bmatrix}
1\\
0\\
\end{bmatrix}$$
and spin down is
$$\chi_- = \begin{bmatrix}
0\\
1\\
\end{bmatrix}$$.

Each component of the angular momentum thus has two eigenspinors. By convention, the z direction is chosen as having the $\chi_+$ and $\chi_-$ states as its eigenspinors. The eigenspinors for the other two orthogonal directions follow from this convention:

$S_z$:

$$\chi_+^z = \begin{bmatrix}
1\\
0\\
\end{bmatrix}$$
$$\chi_-^z = \begin{bmatrix}
0\\
1\\
\end{bmatrix}$$

$S_x$:

$$\chi_+^x = {1 \over \sqrt{2}} \begin{bmatrix}
1\\
1\\
\end{bmatrix}$$
$$\chi_-^x = {1 \over \sqrt{2}} \begin{bmatrix}
1\\
-1\\
\end{bmatrix}$$

$S_y$:

$$\chi_+^y = {1 \over \sqrt{2}} \begin{bmatrix}
1\\
i\\
\end{bmatrix}$$

$$\chi_-^y = {1 \over \sqrt{2}} \begin{bmatrix}
1\\
-i\\
\end{bmatrix}$$

Spherical coordinates (r, θ, φ): radial distance r, polar angle θ (theta), and azimuthal angle φ (phi).

All of these results are but special cases of the eigenspinors for the direction specified by θ and φ in spherical coordinates - those eigenspinors are:

$$\chi_+ = \begin{bmatrix}
\cos (\theta/2)\\
e^{i\varphi} \sin (\theta/2)\\
\end{bmatrix}$$

$$\chi_- = \begin{bmatrix}
\sin (\theta/2)\\
-e^{i\varphi} \cos (\theta/2)\\
\end{bmatrix}$$

== Example usage ==
Suppose there is a spin 1/2 particle in a state
$$\chi = {1 \over \sqrt{5}} \begin{bmatrix}
1\\
2\\
\end{bmatrix}$$
. To determine the probability of finding the particle in a spin up state, we simply multiply the state of the particle by the adjoint of the eigenspinor matrix representing spin up, and square the result. Thus, the eigenspinor allows us to sample the part of the particle's state that is in the same direction as the eigenspinor. First we multiply:

$$c_+ = \begin{bmatrix}
1\ 0\\
\end{bmatrix}
*\chi =  {1 \over \sqrt{5}}$$.

Now, we simply square this value to obtain the probability of the particle being found in a spin up state:

$P_+ = {1 \over 5}$

== Properties ==
Each set of eigenspinors forms a complete, orthonormal basis. This means that any state can be written as a linear combination of the basis spinors.

The eigenspinors are eigenvectors of the Pauli matrices in the case of a single spin 1/2 particle.
