= Spin 1/2 =

Elementary particles with a spin of 1/2

A single point in space can spin continuously without becoming tangled. Notice that after a 360° rotation, the spiral flips between clockwise and counterclockwise orientations. It returns to its original configuration after spinning a full 720°.

In quantum mechanics, spin is an intrinsic property of all elementary particles. All known fermions, the particles that constitute ordinary matter, have a spin of 1/2. The spin number describes how many symmetrical facets a particle has in one full rotation; a spin of 1/2 means that the particle must be rotated by two full turns (through 720°) before it has the same configuration as when it started.

Particles with net spin 1/2 include the proton, neutron, electron, neutrino, and quarks. The dynamics of spin-1/2 objects cannot be accurately described using classical physics; they are among the simplest systems whose description requires quantum mechanics. As such, the study of the behavior of spin-1/2 systems forms a central part of quantum mechanics.

== Stern–Gerlach experiment ==
The necessity of introducing half-integer spin goes back experimentally to the results of the Stern–Gerlach experiment. A beam of atoms is run through a strong heterogeneous magnetic field, causing it to split into N parts depending on the intrinsic angular momentum of the atoms. It was found that for silver atoms, the beam was split in two—the ground state therefore could not be an integer, because even if the intrinsic angular momentum of the atoms were the smallest (non-zero) integer possible, 1, the beam would be split into 3 parts, corresponding to atoms with L_{z} = −1, +1, and 0, with 0 simply being the value known to come between −1 and +1 while also being a whole-integer itself, and thus a valid quantized spin number in this case. The existence of this hypothetical "extra step" between the two polarized quantum states would necessitate a third quantum state, a third beam, which is not observed in the experiment. The conclusion was that silver atoms had net intrinsic angular momentum of 1/2.

== General properties ==
Heuristic depiction of spin angular momentum cones for a spin-1/2 particle.

Spin-1/2 objects are all fermions (a fact explained by the spin–statistics theorem) and satisfy the Pauli exclusion principle. Spin-1/2 particles can have a permanent magnetic moment along the direction of their spin, and this magnetic moment gives rise to electromagnetic interactions that depend on the spin. One such effect that was important in the discovery of spin is the Zeeman effect—the splitting of a spectral line into several components in the presence of a static magnetic field.

Unlike in more complicated quantum mechanical systems, the spin of a spin-1/2 particle can be expressed as a linear combination of just two eigenstates, or eigenspinors. These are traditionally labeled spin up and spin down. Because of this, the quantum-mechanical spin operators can be represented as simple 2 × 2 matrices. These matrices are called the Pauli matrices.

Creation and annihilation operators can be constructed for spin-1/2 objects; these obey the same commutation relations as other angular momentum operators.

== Connection to the uncertainty principle ==
One consequence of the generalized uncertainty principle is that the spin projection operators (which measure the spin along a given direction like x, y, or z) cannot be measured simultaneously. Physically, this means that the axis about which a particle is spinning is ill-defined. A measurement of the z-component of spin destroys any information about the x- and y-components that might previously have been obtained.

== Mathematical description ==
A spin-1/2 particle is characterized by an angular momentum quantum number for spin s of 1/2. In solutions of the Schrödinger equation, angular momentum is quantized according to this number, so that the total spin angular momentum is

$$S = {{\sqrt{\tfrac{1}{2}\left(\tfrac{1}{2}+1\right)}}}\ \hbar = \tfrac{\sqrt{3}}{2}\hbar .$$

However, the observed fine structure when the electron is observed along one axis, such as the z-axis, is quantized in terms of a magnetic quantum number, which can be viewed as a quantization of a vector component of this total angular momentum, which can have only the values of $\pm \frac{1}{2} \hbar$.

Note that these values for angular momentum are functions only of the reduced Planck constant (the angular momentum of any photon), with no dependence on mass or charge.

=== Complex phase ===
Mathematically, quantum mechanical spin is not described by a vector as in classical angular momentum. It is described by a complex-valued vector with two components called a spinor. There are subtle differences between the behavior of spinors and vectors under coordinate rotations, stemming from the behavior of a vector space over a complex field.

When a spinor is rotated by 360° (one full turn), it transforms to its negative, and then after a further rotation of 360°, it transforms back to its initial value again. This is because in quantum theory the state of a particle or system is represented by a complex probability amplitude (wavefunction) $\psi$, and when the system is measured, the probability of finding the system in the state $\psi$ equals $\left\vert \psi^2 \right\vert = \psi * \psi$, the absolute square (square of the absolute value) of the amplitude. In mathematical terms, the quantum Hilbert space carries a projective representation of the rotation group SO(3).

Suppose a detector that can be rotated measures a particle in which the probabilities of detecting some state are affected by the rotation of the detector. When the system is rotated through 360°, the observed output and physics are the same as initially, but the amplitudes are changed for a spin-1/2 particle by a factor of −1 or a phase shift of half of 360°. When the probabilities are calculated, the −1 is squared, (−1)^{2} = 1, so the predicted physics is the same as in the starting position. Also, in a spin-1/2 particle, there are only two spin states, and the amplitudes for both change by the same −1 factor, so the interference effects are identical, unlike the case for higher spins. The complex probability amplitudes are something of a theoretical construct that cannot be directly observed.

If the probability amplitudes rotated by the same amount as the detector, then they would have changed by a factor of −1 when the equipment was rotated by 180°, which when squared would predict the same output as at the start, but experiments show this to be wrong. If the detector is rotated by 180°, the result with spin-1/2 particles can be different from what it would be if not rotated, hence the factor of a half is necessary to make the predictions of the theory match the experiments.

In terms of more direct evidence, physical effects of the difference between the rotation of a spin-1/2 particle by 360° as compared with 720° have been experimentally observed in classic experiments in neutron interferometry. In particular, if a beam of spin-oriented spin-1/2 particles is split, and just one of the beams is rotated about the axis of its direction of motion and then recombined with the original beam, different interference effects are observed depending on the angle of rotation. In the case of rotation by 360°, cancellation effects are observed, whereas in the case of rotation by 720°, the beams are mutually reinforcing.

=== Non-relativistic quantum mechanics ===
The quantum state of a spin-1/2 particle can be described by a two-component complex-valued vector called a spinor. Observable states of the particle are then found by the spin operators S_{x}, S_{y}, and S_{z}, and the total spin operator S.

==== Observables ====
When spinors are used to describe the quantum states, the three spin operators (S_{x}, S_{y}, S_{z}) can be described by 2 × 2 matrices called the Pauli matrices whose eigenvalues are $\pm \frac{1}{2} \hbar$.

For example, the spin projection operator S_{z} affects a measurement of the spin in the z direction:

$$S_z = \frac{\hbar}{2} \sigma _z  = \frac{\hbar}{2}  \begin{bmatrix}
1&0\\ 0&-1 \end{bmatrix}$$

The two eigenvalues of S_{z}, $\pm \frac{1}{2} \hbar$, then correspond to the following eigenspinors:

$$\chi_+ =  \begin{bmatrix} 1 \\ 0 \end{bmatrix} = \left \vert {s_z {=} {+\textstyle\frac 1 2}} \right \rang = | {\uparrow  } \rang = | 0 \rang$$
$$\chi_- =  \begin{bmatrix} 0 \\ 1 \end{bmatrix} = \left \vert {s_z {=} {-\textstyle\frac 1 2}} \right \rang = | {\downarrow} \rang = | 1 \rang.$$

These vectors form a complete basis for the Hilbert space describing the spin-1/2 particle. Thus, linear combinations of these two states can represent all possible states of the spin, including in the x- and y-directions.

The ladder operators are:

$$S_+ = \hbar  \begin{bmatrix} 0&1\\ 0&0 \end{bmatrix} \qquad
S_-= \hbar  \begin{bmatrix} 0&0\\ 1&0 \end{bmatrix}$$

Since $S_\pm = S_x \pm iS_y$, it follows that $S_x = \frac{1}{2}(S_+ + S_-)$ and $S_y = \frac{1}{2i}(S_+ - S_-)$. Thus:

$$S_x = \frac{\hbar}{2} \sigma _x  = \frac{\hbar}{2}  \begin{bmatrix} 0&1\\ 1&0 \end{bmatrix}$$
$$S_y = \frac{\hbar}{2} \sigma _y  = \frac{\hbar}{2}  \begin{bmatrix} 0&-i\\ i&0 \end{bmatrix}$$

Their normalized eigenspinors can be found in the usual way. For $S_x$, they are:

$$\chi^{(x)}_+ = \frac{1}{\sqrt{2}} \begin{bmatrix} 1 \\ 1 \end{bmatrix} = \left \vert {s_x {=} {+\textstyle\frac 1 2}} \right \rang$$
$$\chi^{(x)}_- = \frac{1}{\sqrt{2}} \begin{bmatrix} 1 \\ -1 \end{bmatrix} = \left \vert {s_x {=} {-\textstyle\frac 1 2}} \right \rang$$

For $S_y$, they are:

$$\chi^{(y)}_+ = \frac{1}{\sqrt{2}} \begin{bmatrix} 1 \\ i \end{bmatrix} = \left \vert {s_y {=} {+\textstyle\frac 1 2}} \right \rang$$
$$\chi^{(y)}_- = \frac{1}{\sqrt{2}} \begin{bmatrix} 1 \\ -i \end{bmatrix} = \left \vert {s_y {=} {-\textstyle\frac 1 2}} \right \rang$$

==== Bloch Representation ====
The Hilbert space of a spin-1/2 system is 2-dimensional. Choosing the eigenbasis of $S_z$, a nonzero spinor can be written as

$\left | \psi \right \rangle =a\left | \uparrow \right \rangle+b\left | \downarrow \right \rangle,\,\,\,\,(a,b)\in \mathbb{C} ^2,\,\,\,\,(a,b)\ne (0,0)$

A physical pure state is not a particular vector in the Hilbert space, but a ray: vectors that differ by unit complex number represent the same state: $\left | \psi \right \rangle \sim \lambda \left | \psi \right \rangle,\,\,\,\, \lambda \in U(1)$. This is because the overall phase is physically irrelevant. Equivalently, the space of pure spin-1/2 states is the complex projective line $\mathbb{P} (\mathbb{C} ^2)=\mathbb{CP} ^1\cong S^2$. The pure state associated with $(a,b)$ is written in homogeneous coordinates as $\left [ \psi \right ] =[a:b] \in \mathbb{CP} ^1$. On the coordinate patch where $a\ne0$, one may divide out $a$ and write:

$\left [ \psi \right ] =[1:w],\,\,\,\,w=\frac{b}{a}.$

In this notation, $w$ is a projective coordinate on $\mathbb{CP}^1$, and each $w$ fully characterizes a state. A representative of the same ray (state) is $\left | \uparrow \right \rangle +w\left | \downarrow \right \rangle$, and a normalized one is

$\left | \psi(w) \right \rangle =\frac{\left | \uparrow \right \rangle+w\left | \downarrow \right \rangle }{\sqrt{1+|w|^2}} .$

The coordinate $w=0$ gives $\left | \psi (0) \right \rangle =\left | \uparrow \right \rangle$, spin up in the $z$ direction. The coordinate patch where $a\ne0$ misses $a=0$, namely the state $[\psi]=[0:1]$, which is represented by spin down $\left | \downarrow \right \rangle$. This missing point is added by allowing $w=\infty$. Therefore, the projective coordinate takes value in the extended complex plane, $w\in \mathbb{C}\cup \left \{ \infty \right \}$, which is the Riemann sphere. This is the same two-sphere that appears as the Bloch sphere.

Using south-pole stereographic projection, the extended $w$-plane can be mapped to $S^2\subset \mathbb R^3$ and vice versa. Writing $w=u+iv$, the stereographic map is

$w=\frac{x+iy}{1+z}=e^{i\phi}\tan \frac{\theta}{2},\,\,\,\,(x,y,z)\in S^2$

and the inverse stereographic map is

$\boldsymbol{n}(w)=\left ( \frac{2u}{1+|w|^2} ,\frac{2v}{1+|w|^2},\frac{1-|w|^2}{1+|w|^2} \right ) .$

To recover the usual form of the Bloch state, substitute $w=e^{i\phi}\tan (\theta/2)$ into the normalized representative state vector. This gives:

$\left | \psi \right \rangle =\frac{\left | \uparrow \right \rangle + e^{i\phi}\tan (\theta/2)\left | \downarrow \right \rangle }{\sqrt[]{1+\tan ^2(\theta/2)} } =\cos \frac{\theta}{2}\left | \uparrow \right \rangle+e^{i\phi}\sin \frac{\theta}{2} \left | \downarrow \right \rangle.$

The expectation value of spin measurements (Bloch vector) associated with a normalized state is $\left\langle\psi\right| \boldsymbol \sigma \left | \psi \right \rangle$, where $\boldsymbol \sigma =(\sigma_x, \sigma_y, \sigma _z)$ are the Pauli matrices. For

$\left | \psi(w) \right \rangle =\frac{\left | \uparrow \right \rangle+w\left | \downarrow \right \rangle }{\sqrt{1+|w|^2}}$

this gives

$\left\langle\psi\right| \boldsymbol \sigma \left | \psi \right \rangle=\left ( \frac{2\,\text{Re}\,w }{1+|w|^2} ,\frac{2\,\text{Im}\,w}{1+|w|^2},\frac{1-|w|^2}{1+|w|^2} \right )$

which is exactly the inverse stereographic projection above. Hence each point $\boldsymbol{n}$ on the Bloch sphere simultaneously describes a state (since each $w$ describes a state) and that state's expectation value in spin measurements. The point $\boldsymbol{n}$ thus represents the pure state, call it $\chi_\boldsymbol n$, whose spin is maximally aligned along the direction $\boldsymbol{n}$:

$( \boldsymbol n \cdot \boldsymbol \sigma) \,\chi _{{\boldsymbol { n} }}=\chi _{\boldsymbol n }.$

==== Rotations and Spinors ====
For any unit spatial direction $\boldsymbol v$, the spin observable

$S_\boldsymbol v = \boldsymbol v \cdot \boldsymbol S = \frac{\hbar}{2}\,\boldsymbol v \cdot \boldsymbol \sigma$

has eigenvalues $\plusmn \hbar /2$. A Stern-Gerlach experiment along $\boldsymbol v$ for $\chi_\boldsymbol n$ has the probability

$p_+(\boldsymbol v)=\frac{1+\boldsymbol v\cdot \boldsymbol n}{2}$

of measuring $+\hbar/2$. If one chooses a rotated coordinate system instead, this probability must not change, as it has coordinate-independent physical meaning. This means $\boldsymbol v \cdot \boldsymbol n$ is a scalar under rotations, and thus the Bloch vector $\boldsymbol{n}$ must transform in the same vector representation of rotations as $\boldsymbol v$. Namely,

$\boldsymbol n \mapsto R\boldsymbol n, \,\,\,\, R\in SO(3).$

For a rotation by angle $\alpha$ about a unit direction $\boldsymbol m$, Rodrigues' formula says

$R_\boldsymbol m (\boldsymbol n) = \boldsymbol n \cos \alpha + (\boldsymbol m \times \boldsymbol n)\sin \alpha +\boldsymbol m (\boldsymbol m \cdot \boldsymbol n)(1-\cos \alpha).$

This is the ordinary vector rotation law. The distinctive feature of spin-1/2 is that the state vector itself does not transform as an ordinary vector like the Bloch vector. Instead, it transforms as a spinor. To see where the spinor rotation law comes from, it is useful to recall a purely geometric fact: the composition of two reflections is a rotation. First reflect $\boldsymbol{n}$ through the plane perpendicular to the unit vector $\boldsymbol a$:

$\boldsymbol n \mapsto \boldsymbol n-2 (\boldsymbol a \cdot \boldsymbol n)\boldsymbol a.$

Using Pauli matrices, a vector $\boldsymbol{n}$ may be encoded as the Hermitian matrix $\boldsymbol n \cdot \boldsymbol \sigma$. These matrices satisfy

$(\boldsymbol a \cdot \boldsymbol \sigma)(\boldsymbol b \cdot \boldsymbol \sigma) =\boldsymbol a \cdot \boldsymbol b\,I+i\,(\boldsymbol a \times \boldsymbol b)\cdot \boldsymbol \sigma.$

From this identity one finds the reflection in the plane normal to $\boldsymbol a$ can be written as

$\boldsymbol n \cdot \boldsymbol \sigma\mapsto \left ( \boldsymbol n-2 (\boldsymbol a \cdot \boldsymbol n)\boldsymbol a \right ) \cdot \boldsymbol \sigma =-(\boldsymbol a \cdot \boldsymbol \sigma)(\boldsymbol n \cdot \boldsymbol \sigma)(\boldsymbol a \cdot \boldsymbol \sigma).$

Then, we reflect this through a plane normal to the unit vector $\boldsymbol b$. We choose this plane such that the two planes make an angle $\alpha /2$, since geometrically the composition of these two reflections is a rotation by angle $\alpha$:

$\boldsymbol n \cdot \boldsymbol \sigma\mapsto (\boldsymbol b \cdot \boldsymbol \sigma)(\boldsymbol a \cdot \boldsymbol \sigma)(\boldsymbol n \cdot \boldsymbol \sigma)(\boldsymbol a \cdot \boldsymbol \sigma)(\boldsymbol b \cdot \boldsymbol \sigma).$

Define the unitary matrix $U \in SU(2)$:

$$\begin{aligned}
U&= (\boldsymbol b \cdot \boldsymbol \sigma)(\boldsymbol a \cdot \boldsymbol \sigma)\\
&=\cos \frac{\alpha}{2}\,I-i\,(\boldsymbol m \cdot \boldsymbol \sigma) \sin\frac{\alpha}{2}\\
&=\exp \left ( -\frac{i\alpha}{2} \boldsymbol m \cdot \boldsymbol \sigma \right )
\end{aligned}$$

where $\alpha /2$ is the angle between $\boldsymbol a$ and $\boldsymbol b$ and

$\boldsymbol m = \frac{\boldsymbol a \times \boldsymbol b}{|\boldsymbol a \times \boldsymbol b|}$

is the unit axis of rotation (along the intersection between the two planes). Rotations thus act on vectors by the two-sided multiplication

$U (\boldsymbol n \cdot \boldsymbol \sigma ) U^\dagger =R_\boldsymbol m (\boldsymbol n) \cdot \boldsymbol \sigma .$

$U$ is exactly the rotation operator acting on the spin-1/2 Hilbert space. The connection between the Bloch vector and the spinor can now be made precise. For every direction $\boldsymbol{n}$ on the Bloch sphere, define the subspace projector

$P_\boldsymbol n = \chi _ \boldsymbol n \chi^\dagger _ \boldsymbol n=\frac{1+ \boldsymbol n \cdot \boldsymbol \sigma}{2}.$

This projects onto the one-dimensional eigenspace of $\boldsymbol n \cdot \boldsymbol \sigma$ with eigenvalue $+1$. Under a rotation $\boldsymbol n \cdot \boldsymbol \sigma \mapsto U (\boldsymbol n \cdot \boldsymbol \sigma)U^\dagger$, therefore

$P_\boldsymbol n \mapsto U P_\boldsymbol nU^\dagger=(U\chi_\boldsymbol n)(U\chi_\boldsymbol n)^\dagger,$

so the spinor itself transforms under a single-sided law: $\chi \mapsto U\chi$. The distinction between vector and spinor transformation rules is the origin of the surjective (double-cover) homomorphism $SU(2) \to SO(3)$: the matrices $U$ and $-U$ induce the same rotation to Bloch vectors, since

$(-U) (\boldsymbol n \cdot \boldsymbol \sigma ) (-U)^\dagger= U (\boldsymbol n \cdot \boldsymbol \sigma ) U^\dagger.$

But they act differently on the spinors:

$\chi \mapsto U\chi,\,\,\,\,\,\,\chi \mapsto -U\chi.$

For a $2\pi$ rotation,

$U(\boldsymbol m, 2\pi)=\exp \left ( -i\pi\, \boldsymbol m \cdot \boldsymbol \sigma \right ) =-I,$

so $\chi \mapsto -\chi$, and both the Bloch vector and the projector are unchanged:

$(-\chi)(-\chi)^\dagger=\chi\chi^\dagger.$

A $2\pi$ rotation therefore returns the same physical ray, but changes the sign of the spinor representative. A $4\pi$ rotation gives

$U(\boldsymbol m, 4\pi)=\exp \left ( -i\,2\pi\, \boldsymbol m \cdot \boldsymbol \sigma \right ) =I,$

and returns the same spinor. In an isolated single state, the sign change under a $2\pi$ rotation is an overall phase; in interference experiments, however, a relative sign between two paths can have observable consequences.

=== Relativistic quantum mechanics ===
While non-relativistic quantum mechanics defines spin 1/2 with 2 dimensions in Hilbert space with dynamics that are described in 3-dimensional space and time, relativistic quantum mechanics defines the spin with 4 dimensions in Hilbert space and dynamics described by 4-dimensional space-time.

==== Observables ====
As a consequence of the four-dimensional nature of space-time in relativity, relativistic quantum mechanics uses 4 × 4 matrices to describe spin operators and observables.

== History ==
When physicist Paul Dirac tried to modify the Schrödinger equation so that it was consistent with Einstein's theory of relativity, he found it was only possible by including matrices in the resulting Dirac equation, implying the wave must have multiple components leading to spin.

The 4π spinor rotation was experimentally verified using neutron interferometry in 1974 by Helmut Rauch and collaborators, after being suggested by Yakir Aharonov and Leonard Susskind in 1967.

== See also ==
- Projective representation
