= Austrian-South-East Asian Academic University Network =

International network of universities

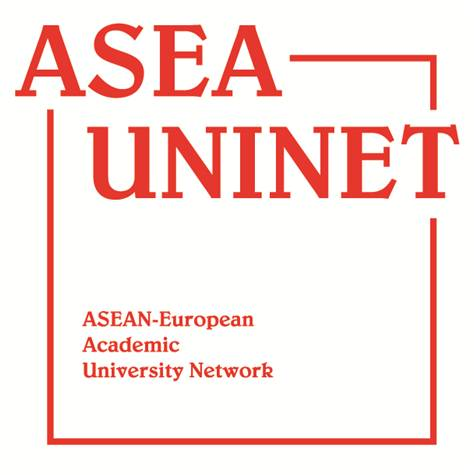
- Formation: 1994
- Type: NGO
- Website: asea-uninet.org

The ASEAN European Academic University Network (ASEA-UNINET) is a network of universities, consisting of European and south-east Asian universities. It was founded in 1994 by universities from Austria, Indonesia, Thailand and Vietnam with the goal of promoting the continuous internationalisation of education and research. Today ASEA-UNINET consists of 83 universities from 17 countries.

== The Beginnings & Aims ==
The foundations for this university network were laid by informal contacts between the University of Innsbruck and various Thai Universities, which date back to the late 1970s. Official visits followed and in the 1980s first partnerships between individual universities were concluded. This included partnership agreements between the University of Innsbruck and the Universities Chulalongkorn and Mahidol in Bangkok, as well as between the Universities of Vienna and Chiang Mai, and between the University of Agricultural Sciences in Vienna and the University of Kasetsart in Bangkok. Another partnership agreement was concluded with Gadjah Mada University in Yogyakarta in 1990. In 1992 the Universities of Innsbruck, Chulalongkorn, Vienna and Chiang Mai signed a joined partnership agreement to include one another in their cooperations. University relations also developed substantially with Vietnam. Furthermore interconnections were established between Austria's partner institutions in Thailand and other countries in the region and thus the idea of ASEA-UNINET was born.

With the aim to unify all these bilateral partnership agreements in one multilateral partnership, the initiator, Prof. Bernd Michael Rode, invited interested universities in Austria, Indonesia, Thailand and Vietnam to participate in the 1st Plenary Meeting in Ho Chi Minh City in December 1994. During this meeting the infrastructure and organization of the newly founded network, was laid down jointly by the participants and the following aims were agreed upon:

- facilitate and encourage cooperation between academic institutions in the fields of teaching, research, staff and student (e.g. joint research projects, staff and student exchange possibilities, Graduate programmes (mainly Ph.D. studies) and postgraduate education, specialized training courses).
- promotion of scientific, cultural and human relations and personal contacts.
- promotion and initiation of projects of mutual interest and benefit for faculties, staff and students.
- Support and assist in forming coalitions of resources for academic activities between member institutions.
- facilitate collaboration and cooperation in education between universities, governmental and non-governmental organisations and economic operators engaged in projects related to education, science, technology and art in countries with member universities.
- act as a forum of continuous discussions on the progress of these projects, and serving as a network of excellence providing expertise and initiatives for entities seeking European-S.E.Asian relations.

== Organization ==
Each Member University has an ASEA-UNINET Coordinator, each country a National Coordinator and each continent a Regional Coordinator. The Chairman is elected at the General Assembly for approx. a 1 1/2 year period.

In order to achieve ASEA UNINET's common goals and objectives financing is sought by all member institutions from university and national government sources. Project contributions are made by the member-universities on the basis of fair balance according to their economic and financial situation. Additional financial support is sought from regional (e.g. EU, ASEAN) as well as international agencies and from the private sector according to available projects.

== Focal Areas ==
Almost all areas of academic and economic interest are represented within ASEA-UNINET. The current focus areas of cooperation include:

- Science and Technology
- Economic and Social Sciences
- Health, Pharmacy and Medicine
- Humanities, Culture and Music

== Members ==
In 1994 this network consisted of 25 universities from Austria, Thailand, Indonesia and Vietnam. In the following years, many universities from the following countries have joined the network: Kingdom of Cambodia, Czech Republic, Germany, Greece, Italy, Malaysia, Myanmar, Philippines, Portugal, Slovakia, Spain. Pakistan and Iran have currently an associated status for specific projects. Since February 2018 ASEA-UNINET consists of 83 Universities from 17 different countries.

Countries	Member Universities	Memberships
Austria	University of Innsbruck	1994
Austria	University of Vienna	1994
Austria	University of Graz	1998
Austria	University of Linz	1998
Austria	University of Salzburg	1998
Austria	Vienna University of Technology	1994
Austria	Graz University of Technology	1994
Austria	University of Natural Resources and Life Sciences, Vienna	1994
Austria	Vienna University of Economics and Business	1994
Austria	University of Leoben	1996
Austria	University of Veterinary Medicine Vienna	1996
Austria	University of Music and Performing Arts, Vienna	1997
Austria	University of Music and Dramatic Arts, Mozarteum in Salzburg	1998
Austria	University of Music and Dramatic Arts, Graz	1998
Austria	Medical University of Innsbruck	2004
Austria	Medical University Graz	2004
Austria	Medical University of Vienna	2004
Austria	Danube University Krems	2014
Austria	University of Applied Arts Vienna	2016
Czech Republic	Technical University of Prague	1997
Czech Republic	Technical University of Liberec	2017
Kingdom of Cambodia	Royal University of Phnom Penh	2017
Denmark	University of Southern Denmark	(1997 - 2016)
Germany	University of Freiburg	(2002 - 2016)
Germany	University of Passau	
Greece	University of Ioannina	1998
Indonesia	Gadjah Mada University	1994
Indonesia	Sepuluh Nopember Institute of Technology	1994
Indonesia	Diponegoro University	1994
Indonesia	University of Indonesia	1996
Indonesia	Bandung Institute of Technology	1999
Indonesia	Udayana University	2008
Indonesia	University of North Sumatra	2014
Indonesia	Airlangga University	2014
Indonesia	Hasanuddin University	2017
Indonesia	Indonesia Institute of the Arts Yogyakarta	2017
Indonesia	Bogor Institute of Agriculture	2017
Iran	Sharif University of Technology	2016
Iran	Shiraz University	2017
Italy	University of Trento	1999
Italy	Technical University of Milano	2002
Italy	University of Genoa	2008
Italy	University of Brescia	2005
Italy	University of Verona	until 2014
Italy	Free University of Bozen-Bolzano	2017
Malaysia	Universiti Putra Malaysia	2007
Malaysia	University of Malaya	2013
Malaysia	Universiti Teknikal Malaysia Melaka	2013
Malaysia	Universiti Kebangsaan Malaysia	2013
Malaysia	Universiti Utara Malaysia	2013
Myanmar	Yangon Technological University	2015
Netherland	University of Groningen	(2002 – 2017)
Netherland	University of Utrecht	(1998 – 2017
Pakistan	University of Karachi	2006
Philippines	University of the Philippines Diliman	1997
Poland	Wrocław University of Economics	(2016 – 2017)
Portugal	University of Porto	2016
Slovakia	Comenius University	
Spain	University of Murcia	2005
Spain	University of Barcelona	(until 2014)
Spain	University of Oviedo	(until 2014)
Thailand	Chulalongkorn University, Bangkok	1994
Thailand	Mahidol University, Bangkok	1994
Thailand	Kasetsart University, Bangkok	1994
Thailand	King Mongkut's Institute of Technology, Ladkrabang	1994
Thailand	King Mongkut's University of Technology, North Bangkok	1994
Thailand	King Mongkut's University of Technology, Thonburi	1994
Thailand	Chiang Mai University	1994
Thailand	Khon Kaen University	1994
Thailand	Mahasarakham University	2001
Thailand	Naresuan University	2002
Thailand	Prince-of-Songkla University, Hat Yai	1994
Thailand	Suranaree University, Nakon Rachasima	1994
Thailand	Silpakorn University, Bangkok	1998
Thailand	Srinakharinwirot University, Bangkok,	1998
Thailand	Thammasat University, Bangkok	2002
Thailand	Burapha University	2007
Thailand	Ramkhamhaeng University, Bangkok	2008
Thailand	Ubon Ratchathani University	2008
Vietnam	Hanoi University of Science and Technology (HUST), Hanoi	1994
Vietnam	National Economics University, Hanoi	1994
Vietnam	University of Transport and Communication, Hanoi	2007
Vietnam	Vietnam National Academy of Music, Hanoi	
Vietnam	Hanoi University of Agriculture, Hanoi	
Vietnam	Hanoi University, Hanoi	
Vietnam	Hue University, Hue City	2005
Vietnam	University of Da Nang, Da Nang City	2007
Vietnam	Vietnam National University - Ho Chi Minh City, Ho Chi Minh City	1994
Vietnam	University of Medicine and Pharmacy, Ho Chi Minh City	1994
