= Hiesmayr =

Hiesmayr is a German-language surname. Notable people with this surname include:

- Beatrix Hiesmayr (born 1975), Austrian physicist
- Ernst Hiesmayr (1920–2006), Austrian architect
- Herbert Hiesmayr (1940–2016), Austrian academic painter
