= Sophie Primig =

Austrian-Australian metallurgist

Sophie Primig is an Austrian and Australian metallurgist whose research concerns the effects of manufacturing processes on high-performance alloys including nickel superalloys, stainless steel, and titanium alloys, for applications including aerospace and manufacturing. She is Alcoa Distinguished Professor and ARC Future Fellow in the School of Materials Science and Engineering at the University of New South Wales, where she heads the Engineering Microstructures team, and is a co-investigator on the 3D Additive project.

== Education and career ==
Primig grew up in Austria, and became a student at the University of Leoben in Austria. There, she received a master's degree in materials science and engineering in 2008, and completed a Ph.D. in mining and metallurgical engineering in 2012.

She remained at the University of Leoben as a postdoctoral researcher and senior scientist from 2013 to 2015. In 2015, she moved to Australia, becoming a lecturer at the University of New South Wales. There, she progressed through the ranks as senior lecturer, associate professor, and, since 2023, professor. She was named as an ARC DECRA Fellow in 2018, as Alcoa Distinguished Professor in 2024, and as an ARC Future Fellow in 2025.

== Recognition ==
Primig was elected as a Fellow of the Royal Society of New South Wales in 2025.
