= IMC University of Applied Sciences Krems =

Coordinates: 48.4086°N 15.5882°E

IMC Fachhochschule Krems
- Type: Private
- Established: 1994
- Administrative staff: ~350
- Students: 3.100
- Location: Krems an der Donau, Austria
- Website: imc.ac.at

The IMC University of Applied Sciences Krems (Austrian German: IMC Hochschule für angewandte Wissenschaften Krems) is a private Austrian university. Founded in 1994, IMC Krems has three campuses in Krems, Austria.

IMC Krems offers 29 degree programs, has 3,100 students, 560 lecturers, as well over 200 partner universities in 36 countries. With three locations in and around Krems, the university offers bachelor and master's degree programs in business, health sciences and life sciences.

Besides full-time courses, some programs are also offered in a part-time format. Professional development training courses in languages and hospital hygiene are also available.

== History ==
IMC Krems was founded in 1994 as International Management Center GmbH (IMC), after the 1993 Fachhochschul-Studiengesetz Act (University of Applied Sciences Studies Act) had opened the way for private-sector institutions to provide university degree programs. It started with an English-language degree program in Tourism and Leisure Management that included a compulsory semester abroad in an internship – a first in Austria.

In 1999, IMC Krems started the Export-Oriented Management EU-ASEAN-NAFTA degree program. Two further programs, Health Management, and Business Administration and E-Business Management for SMEs, were launched in 2001. IMC Krems was awarded the status of university of applied sciences by the Austrian Federal Ministry of Education, Science and Culture in April 2002. In the same year, the Medical and Pharmaceutical Biotechnology degree program was introduced, followed by the opening of the biotechnology centre in March 2003. The IMC Krems second part-time degree program, Health Management, began in September 2003 with 30 students.

IMC Krems expanded to a second location, wings D and G at the new Campus Krems, in 2005. Degree programs in Physiotherapy and Midwifery were added to the curriculum in 2006. In 2008 the university launched the Advanced Nursing Practice bachelor program, while the Music Therapy program started in 2009. The foundation stone for the new wing G1 at Campus Krems was laid in May 2011.

IMC Krems added five master's degree programs in September 2011:

- Marketing and Sales,
- Management of Health Institutions,
- Management of SME,
- Management, and
- Regulatory Affairs.

The new Occupational Therapy bachelor's degree program also started in 2011 The following year saw the first intake of students on the General Nursing bachelor program, and on the Environmental and Sustainability Management, and Music Therapy master's degree programs.

The Business Administration bachelor program began in September 2014, followed by the International Wine Business bachelor program in September 2015. The Digital Business Innovation and Transformation master's degree program started in September 2017. Three new degree programs started in autumn 2018: the English-language Applied Chemistry bachelor's degree programs, and two master programs, Advanced Nursing Practice and Applied Health Sciences.

One new degree program was scheduled to begin in autumn 2019: the English-language bachelor's degree program Informatics.

== Research ==
IMC Krems' research activities are funded by means of research grants and funding from companies. The Josef Ressel Centre for Personalised Therapy is an example of a research activity funded by such a grant. The Research Institute for Applied Bioanalytics and Drug Development focuses primarily on contract research for businesses. The CSR and innovation research group, part of the Department of Business, receives finance from a major research fund.

== Awards ==
- Spring 2016: IMC Krems received the highest rating in the categories student mobility, international academic staff and foreign language programs in the EU-initiated U-Multirank global university ranking..
- Spring 2016: In the CHE ranking, the English-language Medical and Pharmaceutical Biotechnology bachelor's and master's degree programs finished among the leaders 17 times in the various categories assessed. The ranking evaluated 300 universities and universities of applied sciences in the German-speaking countries according to a range of criteria.

== Accreditations ==
Evaluationsagentur Baden-Württemberg (evalag): IMC Krems’ internal quality management system has been awarded certification by evalag, an international quality assurance agency based in Baden-Württemberg, Germany.

Under the Hochschul-Qualitätssicherungsgesetz (Higher Education Quality Assurance Act), higher education institutes in Austria have to be externally audited at least every six years. ASIIN, an agency specialising in accreditation of engineering, IT, science and mathematics degree programs, awarded its quality seal to IMC Krems’ Medical and Pharmaceutical Biotechnology program. IMC Krems was the first Austrian university to receive ASIIN certification for one of its degrees.

== See also ==
- List of Jesuit sites
