= Horst Bischof =

Austrian computer scientist

- Born: 26 March 1967 (age 59); Saanen, Switzerland
- Education: Technical University of Vienna
- Scientific career
- Fields: Computer vision
- Workplaces: Technical University of Vienna; University of Natural Resources and Life Sciences, Vienna; Graz University of Technology
- Doctoral advisor: Walter Kropatsch

Horst Bischof (born 26 March 1967) is an Austrian computer scientist and full professor at the Institute of Computer Graphics and Vision (ICG) at Graz University of Technology. Since 1 October 2023, Horst Bischof serves as rector of Graz University of Technology.

== Early life and education ==
Horst Bischof was born on 26 March 1967 in Saanen, Switzerland. He grew up in the Upper Styria region and completed his Matura at the Gymnasium in Murau in 1985. Bischof then studied computer science at TU Wien. After his graduation in 1990, he worked as a researcher at the University of Natural Resources and Life Sciences in Vienna. In 1992, Bischof returned to TU Wien where he received his degree of a doctor of technical sciences in 1993, his thesis being on Pyramidal Neural Networks. In 1998, he qualified for lecturing in applied computer science by his habilitation on Neural Vision Modules.

== Career and research ==
Until 2001, Bischof was assistant professor for Pattern Recognition and Image Processing at the Institute of Computer Aided Automation at TU Wien.

In 2004, Bischof became full professor for Computer Vision at Graz University of Technology following an appointment as guest professor from 2001 to 2003. He served as vice rector for research to the university from 2011 to 2023. In October 2023, Horst Bischof took office as rector of Graz University of Technology being elected for a four-year term.

Bischof's research foci are on object recognition, visual learning, motion and tracking, visual surveillance and biometrics, medical computer vision, and adaptive methods for computer vision. So far, he has more than 800 scientific publications which were cited about 50,000 times resulting in an h-index of 96.

Bischof is a member of the European Laboratory for Learning and Intelligent Systems unit in Graz.
