= Peter Uggowitzer =

Austrian-Swiss metallurgist

Peter J. Uggowitzer
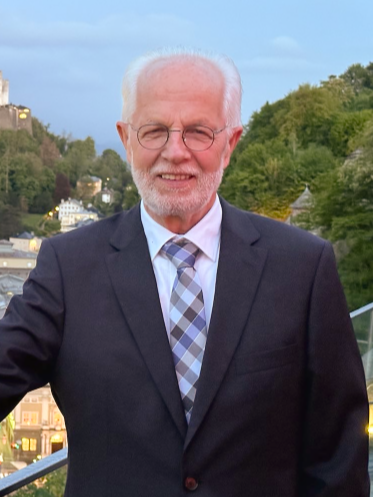
- Born: 24 November 1950 (age 75); Klagenfurt, Austria
- Citizenship: Austrian; Swiss
- Education: Montanuniversität Leoben
- Known for: Ni-free stainless steels, magnesium alloy implants, aluminium crossover alloys
- Awards: Great Badge of Honour of the State of Styria (2025); ETH Golden Owl (2005, 2012)
- Scientific career
- Fields: Nonferrous metallurgy Ferrous metallurgy
- Workplaces: Montanuniversität Leoben; ETH Zurich
- Thesis: Plasticity and Fracture of Ferritic-Martenitic Two-Phase Steels (1981)
- Doctoral advisor: Hein-Peter Stüwe; Hellmut Fischmeister

Peter J. Uggowitzer (born 24 November 1950 in Klagenfurt am Wörthersee in Austria) is an Austrian-Swiss metallurgist and materials scientist. He has contributied in several fields of metallurgy, specially in the development of nickel-free austenitic stainless steels, aluminium crossover alloys and biodegradable magnesium alloys for medical implants.

== Academic life ==
Born in Carinthia, Uggowitzer studied materials science at Montanuniversität Leoben, where he earned his doctorate in 1981 in the field of dual-phase steels. He then joined ETH Zurich, where he completed his habilitation in 1993 and served as a professor at the Department of Materials from 1996 to 2015. In 2017, he returned to Montanuniversität Leoben, where he was Professor for Alloy Design of Light Metals at the Chair of Nonferrous Metallurgy until 2024.

One of his early milestones was the development of a new family of nickel-free nitrogen austenitic steels, which are now widely used in medical devices as well as in the jewellery and watchmaking industries. Later, his research focus shifted to light metals, particularly aluminium and magnesium.

In 2019, Uggowitzer and co-authors pointed out that the phenomenon of ageing of aluminium alloys does not occur at the atomic scale. In late 2020, Uggowitzer and co-authors initiated the research field of radiation-resistant aluminium alloys for future space exploration.

Uggowitzer was awarded the Great Decoration of Honor of the State of Styria by Governor Mario Kunasek and Deputy Governor Manuela Khom.

== Awards ==
- 1987: Masing Memorial Prize of the German Society for Materials Science (Deutsche Gesellschaft für Materialkunde)
- 2005 and 2012: ETH Best Teaching Award – Golden Owl
- 2014: Tammann Commemorative Medal of the German Society for Materials Science (Deutsche Gesellschaft für Materialkunde)
- 2025: Great Badge of Honour of the State of Styria
