= Andreas Lechner =

Austrian architect

- Born: 1974 (age 51–52); Graz, Austria
- Occupations: Architect author academic

Academic background
- Education: Graz University of Technology

Academic work
- Notable works: Thinking Design – Blueprint for an architecture of typology
- Website: www.andreaslechner.at

Andreas Lechner is an Austrian architect, author and academic. In 2020, he was awarded with the Gold Medal in the Best Book Design from all over the World competition by the Stiftung Buchkunst for his book, Thinking Design – Blueprint for an architecture of typology.

Lechner was a university assistant at Graz University of Technology from 2007 to 2011, earning his doctorate in 2009 with a dissertation on commercial buildings in Tokyo. Subsequently, he held positions as an assistant professor and Post-Doc at the Università Iuav di Venezia and the Kunstakademiets Arkitektskole in Copenhagen from 2011 to 2017. He published his habilitation thesis with Park Books in Zurich in 2018. In 2021, the book was published in a second revised and expanded German edition, as well as its inaugural English translation titled Thinking Design – Blueprint for an architecture of typology.

Lechner is leading the research group, Counterintuitive Typologies, he is a visiting professor at the Polytechnic University of Milan and a voting member of the Graz Historic Town Expert Commission.
