= Otto Nußbaumer =

Austrian physicist (1876–1930)

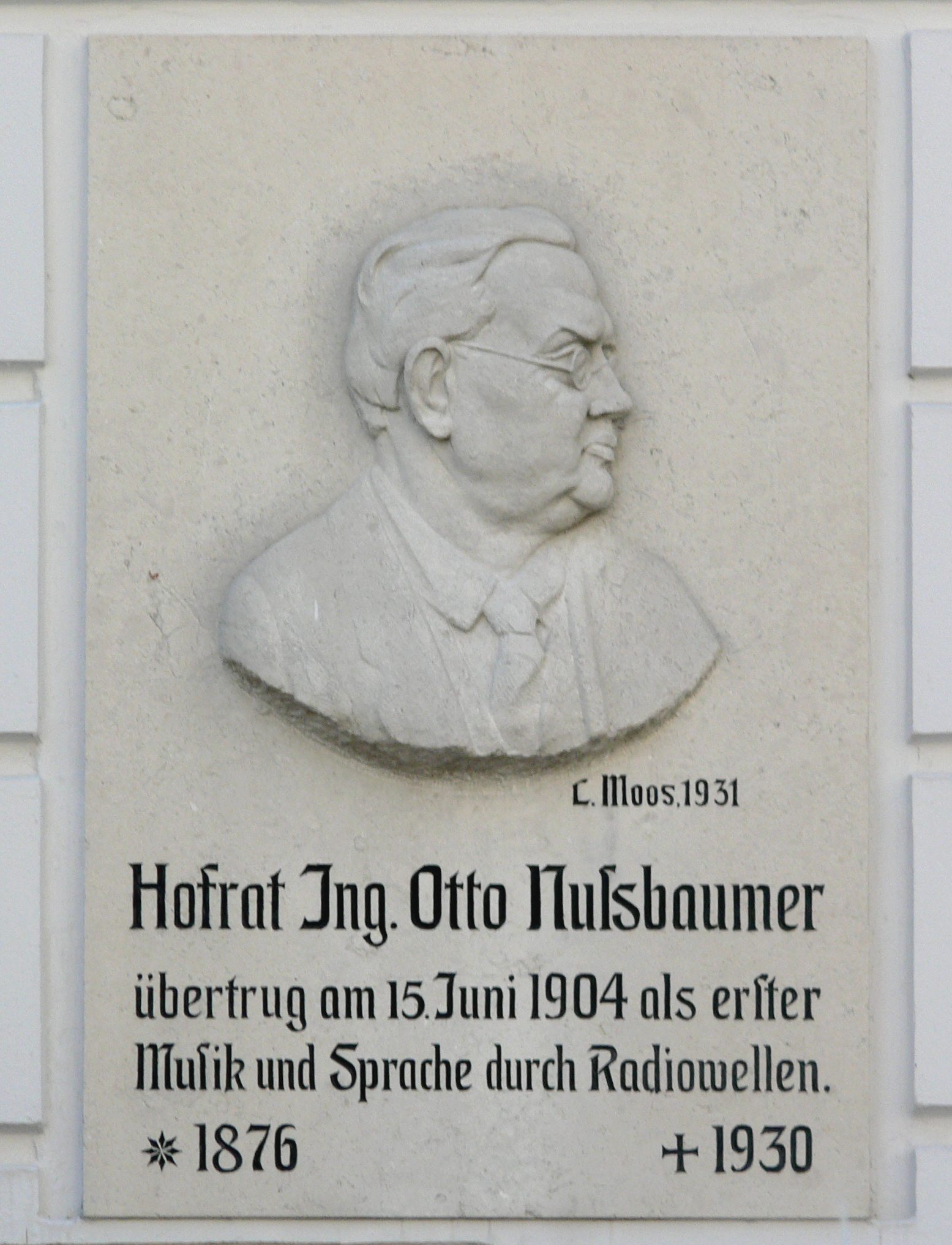
- Otto Nußbaumer memorial plaque at the Salzburg New Residence building,
- Born: 31 March 1876; Innsbruck-Wilten, Austria-Hungary
- Died: 5 January 1930 (aged 53); Salzburg, Austria
- Other name: Otto Nussbaumer
- Known for: first wireless transmission of music

Otto Nußbaumer (31 March 1876 – 5 January 1930) was an Austrian physicist. In 1904, he was the first to transmit music via wireless telegraphy at Albert von Ettingshausen’s university lab.

== Biography ==
Otto Nußbaumer was the son of a stationmaster. His father was transferred to the Styrian city of Leoben when Nußbaumer was pre-school aged. Engelbert Kobald, professor for physics and mathematics at the University of Leoben constructed electrical toys for Nußbaumer thus sparking Otto's technical interest. So did his father's job, due to which Otto Nußbaumer learned morsing at an early age. After unsuccessful years at the Kremsmünster Abbey school showing problems in learning languages, his father transferred him to the Landesoberrealschule, a school focussing on science and technology, in Graz. Still a pupil, Nußbaumer started working at the labs of Michael Radaković and Paul Czermak constructing electrical devices. He later studied mechanical engineering at Graz University of Technology as there existed no distinct study programme for electrical engineering, yet.

After his graduation in 1901, he served as university assistant to Albert von Ettingshausen at the institute of physics for six years. On June 15, 1904, Otto Nußbaumer succeeded in transmitting music (the local Styrian anthem Hoch vom Dachstein) wirelessly over a distance of 30 metres through several rooms and closed doors. He did so by using an electric arc and a detector containing oxidized iron powder which he constructed on his own as the problem of suitable detectors were unsolved at that time. Yet, he lacked financial means and support to transfer his ideas into patents and commercial appliances.

In 1907, Otto Nußbaumer became civil servant working for the state construction department in Graz. In 1908, he moved to Salzburg with his wife and baby girl. There, he started to work for the local government later heading the department for mechanical and electrical engineering. Nußbaumer suffered from tuberculosis and its consequences, leading to his early death in 1930.

== Honors ==
- Decoration of Honour for Services to the Republic of Austria - Decoration of Honour in Gold, 1929.
- Honorary citizen of Salzburg, 1929.
- In Salzburg and Graz, streets are named after Otto Nußbaumer.

== Publications ==
- Otto Nussbaumer: Kurzer Bericht über Versuche zur Übertragung von Tönen mittels elektrischer Wellen. Physikalische Zeitschrift, Vol. 5, 1904, pp. 796–797.
