= Günther Tschabuschnig =

Austrian computer scientist

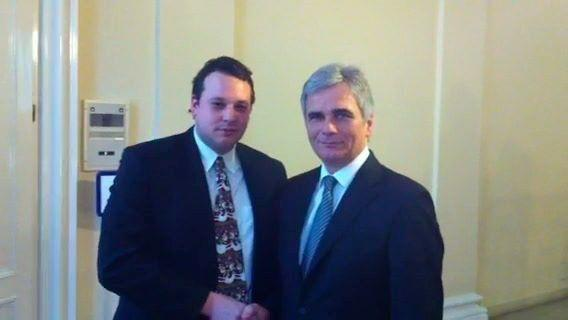
Tschabuschnig with the Austrian chancellor Werner Faymann

Günther Tschabuschnig (born 1982) is an Austrian computer scientist.

Raised in Carinthia, Tschabuschnig studied Medical computer science at the Vienna University of Technology and the Medical University of Vienna. It was followed by a study of information management at these two universities as well as research in Washington, DC, Olmüz and Erlangen. Since 2009 he has worked as a consultant in the field of e-government in the Austrian Federal Chancellery and in various organizations. His focus is on innovation planning and management, implementation of IT projects on issues of e-government and e-democracy (open government data), as well as in collaborations with government, academia and industry. Tschabuschnig is a board member of the Association for Data Processing (ADV) Vienna. In 2012 he was co-winner of the eAward in Vienna. When Cooperation Open Government Data Austria he worked as a "Technology Evangelist". At the University of Bremen he works on his PhD-degree in the field of Open Data with Professor Herbert Kubicek.
