= Graz University of Technology =

Institute of technology in Austria

- Technische Universität Graz
- Motto: Wissen – Technik – Leidenschaft
- Motto in English: Science – Passion – Technology
- Type: public research university Institute of technology
- Established: 1811; 215 years ago
- Budget: €323 million
- Vice-Chancellor: Horst Bischof
- Academic staff: 1,836
- Administrative staff: 1,147
- Students: 17.563 (Winter semester 2025/26)
- Location: Graz, Styria, Austria; 47°04′08″N 15°27′00″E
- Website: tugraz.at

Graz University of Technology (German: Technische Universität Graz, short TU Graz) is a public research university located in Styria, Austria. It was founded in 1811 by Archduke John of Austria and is the oldest science and technology research and educational institute in Austria. It currently comprises seven faculties and is a public university. It offers 20 bachelor's and 37 master's study programmes (of which 23 are in English) across all technology and natural sciences disciplines. Doctoral training is organised in 14 English-speaking doctoral schools. The university has more than 17,000 students, and around 1,900 students graduate every year. The Graz University of Technology and the University of Graz co-operate in teaching and research of natural sciences.

The university has a staff of 3,821. Research areas are combined in five fields of expertise. TU Graz, the University of Leoben and TU Wien together with other partners form the network Austrian Universities of Technology (TU Austria) with more than 65,000 students and 16,000 staff.

== Campus ==
The university has multiple campuses, as it is mainly situated on three sites in the city, two in the centre of Graz and one in the southeast of the city.

- Old Technik (Rechbauerstrasse / Lessingstrasse)
- New Technik (Kopernikusgasse / Petersgasse)
- Inffeldgasse

Campus buildings at the Graz University of Technology

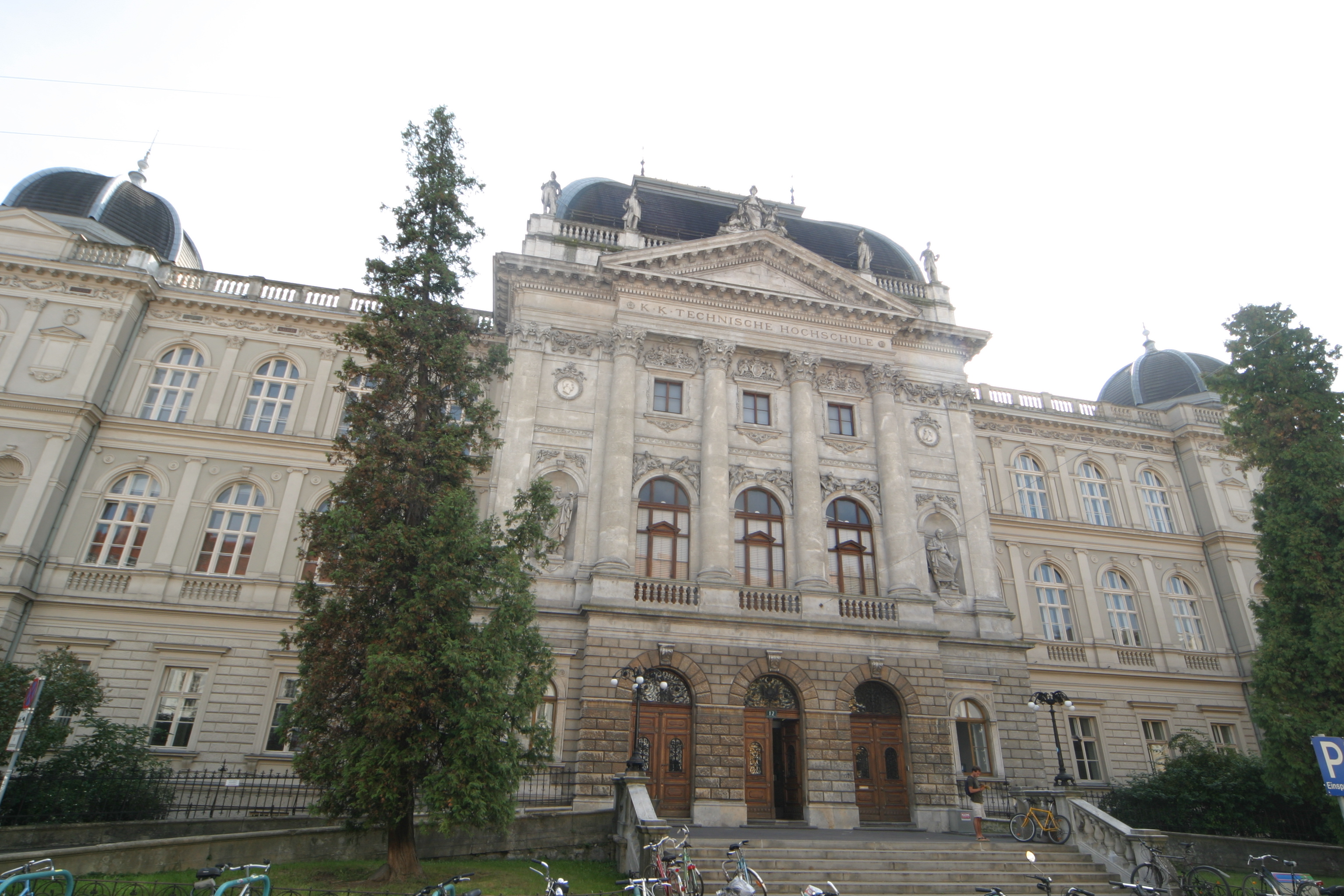
Main building

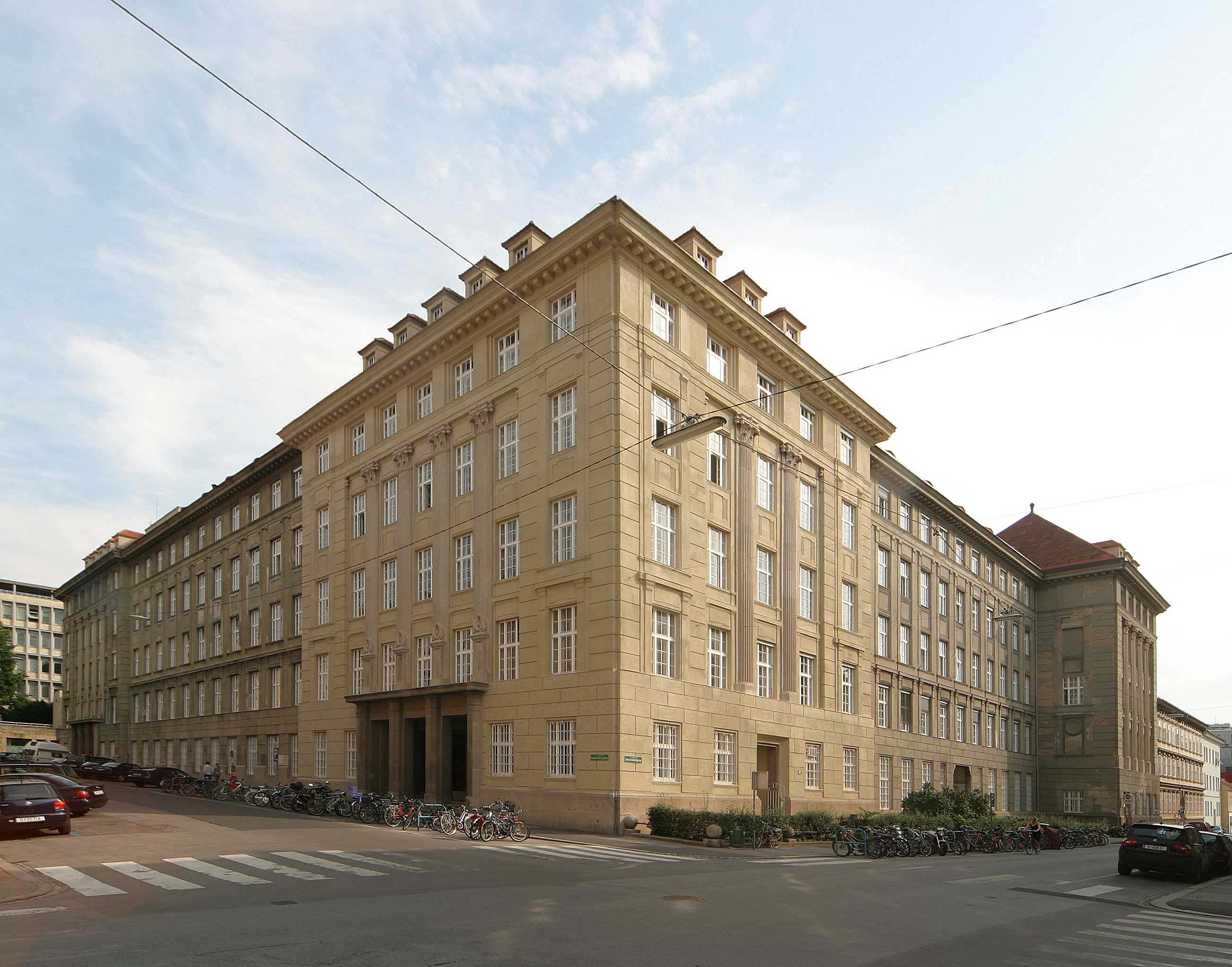
New Technology building

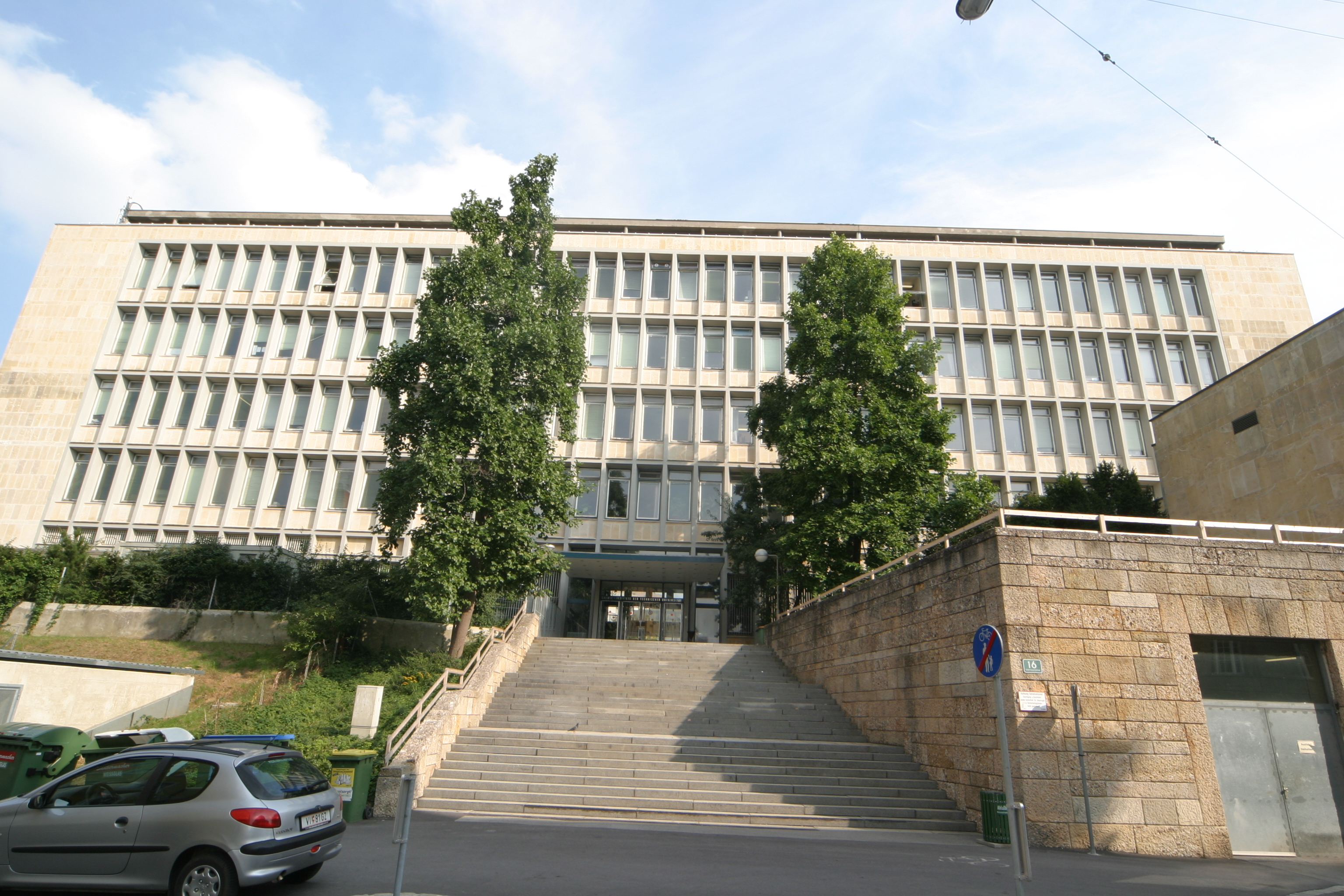
BMT building (Biomedical Engineering)

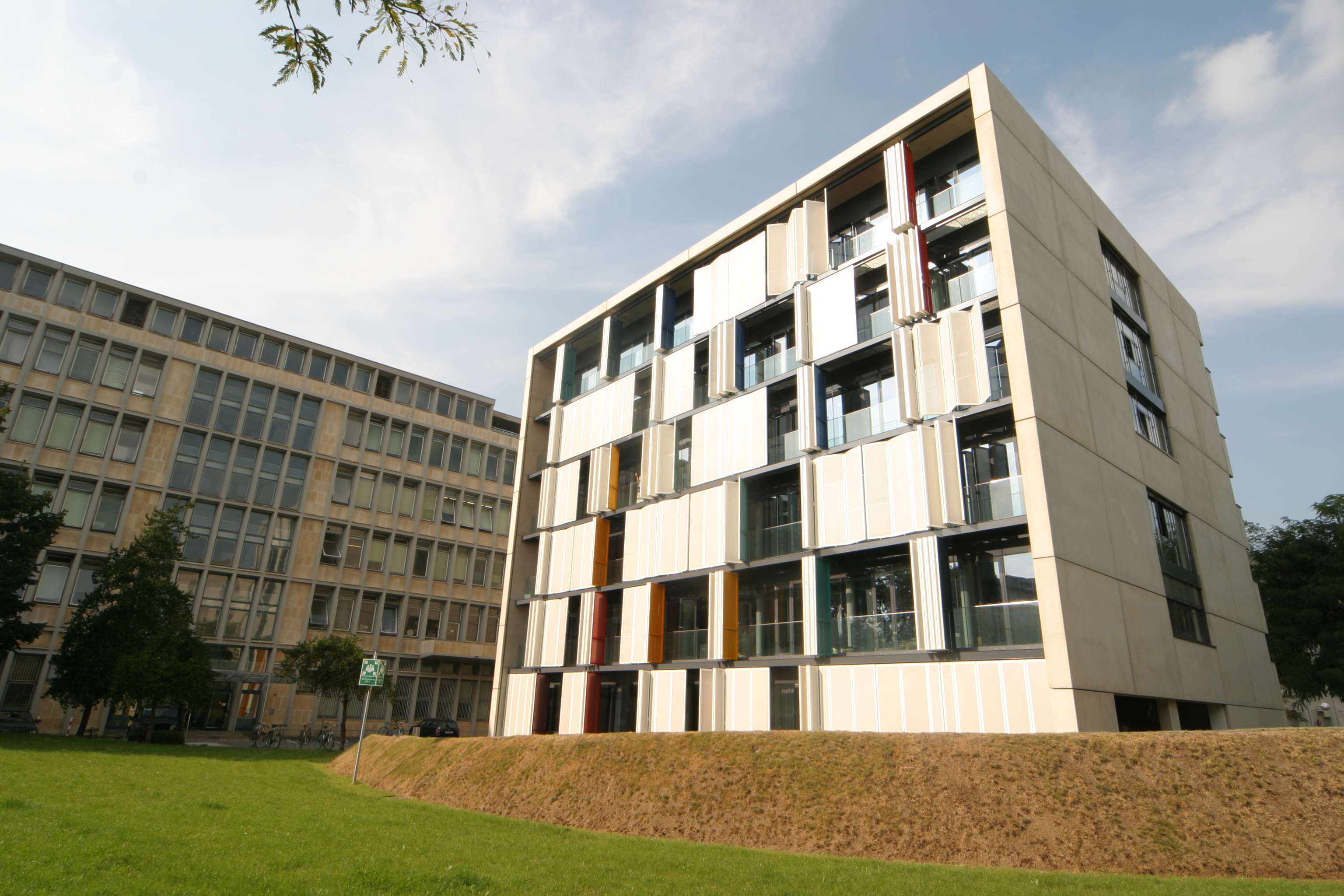
A further Chemistry building

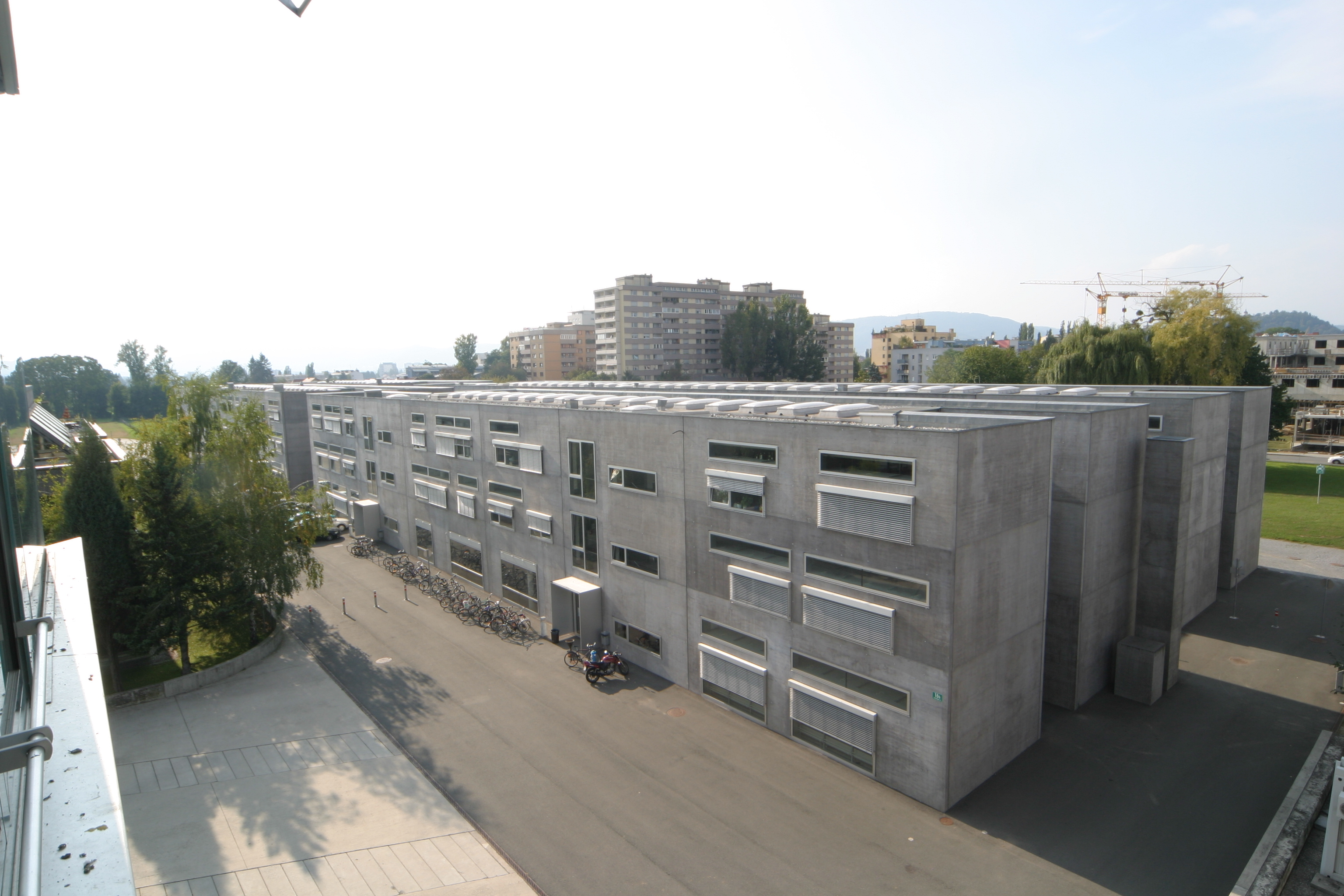
Institutes for Computer Science (Inffeldgasse 16)

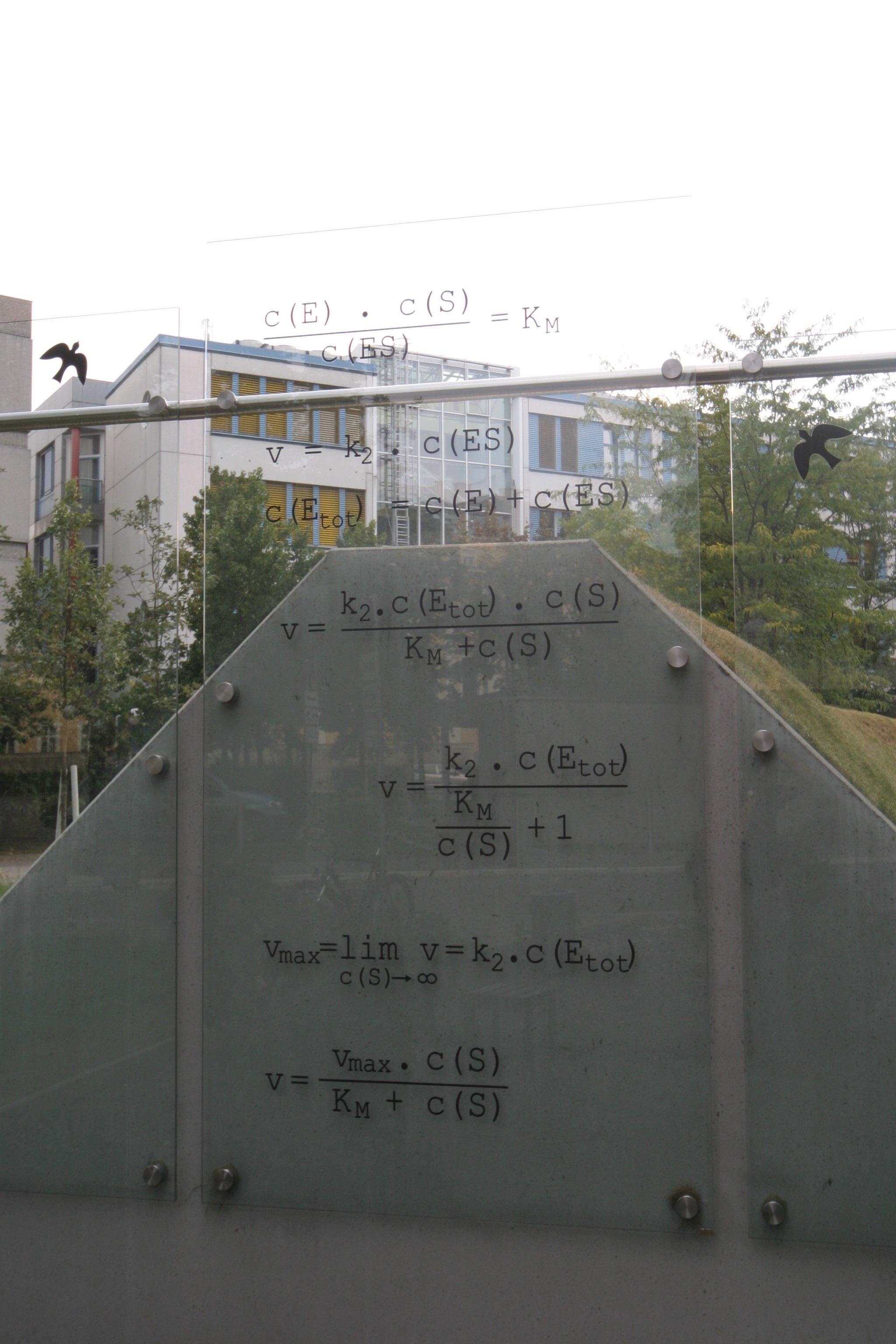
Engineering Mathematics/ Geodesy building

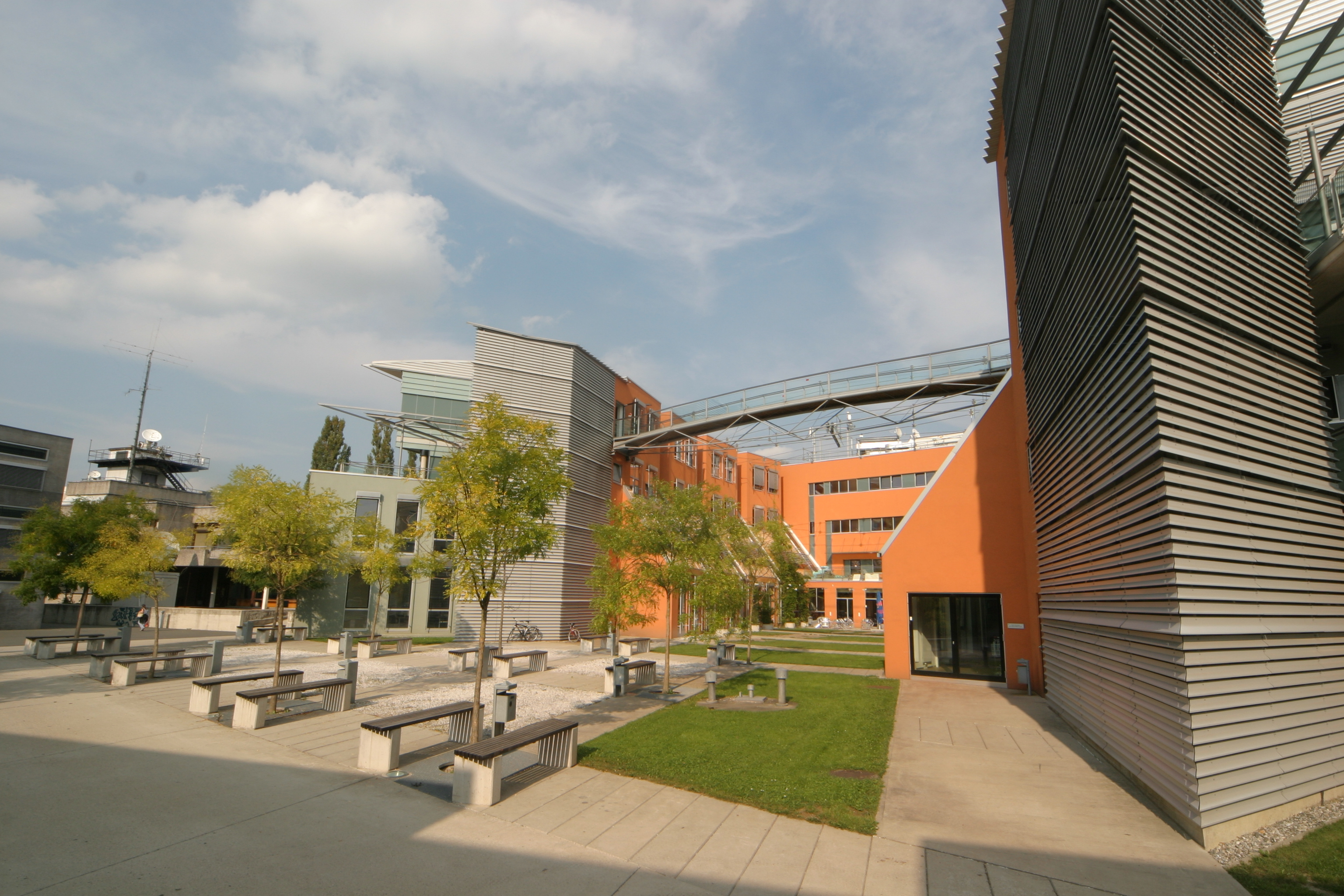
Study Centre (Inffeldgasse 10)

== History ==
1811: The Joanneum is founded by Archduke John of Austria. The first subjects taught were physics, chemistry, astronomy, mineralogy, botany, and technology. Friedrich Mohs became the first professor of mineralogy in 1812.

1864: The Styrian government makes it the Joanneum Regional and Technical College.

1874: The Austrian government takes over the Imperial-Royal College of Technology in Graz.

1888: Opening of the Main Building (Old Technik) by Franz Joseph I of Austria.

1901: The Technical College is granted the right to award doctorates.

1955: The Technical College is divided into three faculties.

1976: The Technical College is divided into five faculties and renamed Graz University of Technology, Archduke-Johann-University (Technische Universität Graz, Erzherzog-Johann Universität).

2004: The new Austrian university law (UG 2002) is fully implemented – the university is divided into seven faculties.

== Organization ==
The university consists of seven faculties:

- Faculty of Architecture
- Faculty of Civil Engineering Sciences
- Faculty of Computer Science and Biomedical Engineering
- Faculty of Electrical and Information Engineering
- Faculty of Mechanical Engineering and Economic Sciences
- Faculty of Mathematics, Physics and Geodesy
- Faculty of Technical Chemistry, Chemical and Process Engineering, and Biotechnology

== Teaching ==
Students at TU Graz have a choice of 20 bachelor programmes and 37 master programmes. Graduates receive the academic degrees BSc, MSc or Diplom-Ingenieur/-in (Dipl.-Ing.). The doctoral programmes (Dr.techn. and Dr.rer.nat.) are offered as postgraduate programmes. Continuing education is offered in the framework of Lifelong Learning and consists of 12 part-time master's programmes and university programmes plus a range of other courses.

== Facts and figures ==
- Beginners: 1,851
- Graduates (academic year 2024/25): 1,952
- Federal budget 2025: €226.8 million
- Income from third-party funds 2025: €96.2 million
- Floor space (m^{2}): 278,407
- Non-academic staff: 1,147
- Academic staff: 1,836 (of which project staff 1,075)
- Lecturers/student assistants: 840

Data from: 2025/26

== Rankings ==
University rankings

Global – Overall
- ARWU World: 601–700 (2025)
- QS World: 427 (2026)
- THE World: 601–800 (2026)
- USNWR Global: 1,048 (2026)

In Shangai Ranking's 2023 Global Ranking of Academic Subjects, it is in the 201–300 range in biomedical engineering and in the 301–400 range in atmospheric science and in mathematics. It can be found in the 401–500 range in biotechnology, in chemistry, and in materials science & engineering. In the 2023 Leiden Ranking, the PP_{top10%} analysis puts it on position 558, the PP_{industry} ranks Graz University of Technology on place 13.

== Student teams ==
The university has more than a dozen student teams in different disciplines, some of them compete in international student challenges.

The TU Graz Racing team was founded in 2002. With its car TANKIA (abbreviation for There are no kangaroos in Austria), which is constructed and built each year from scratch, it won different competitions in the Formula Student series. Since 2021, the team has taken part in the Formula Student Electric category exclusively.

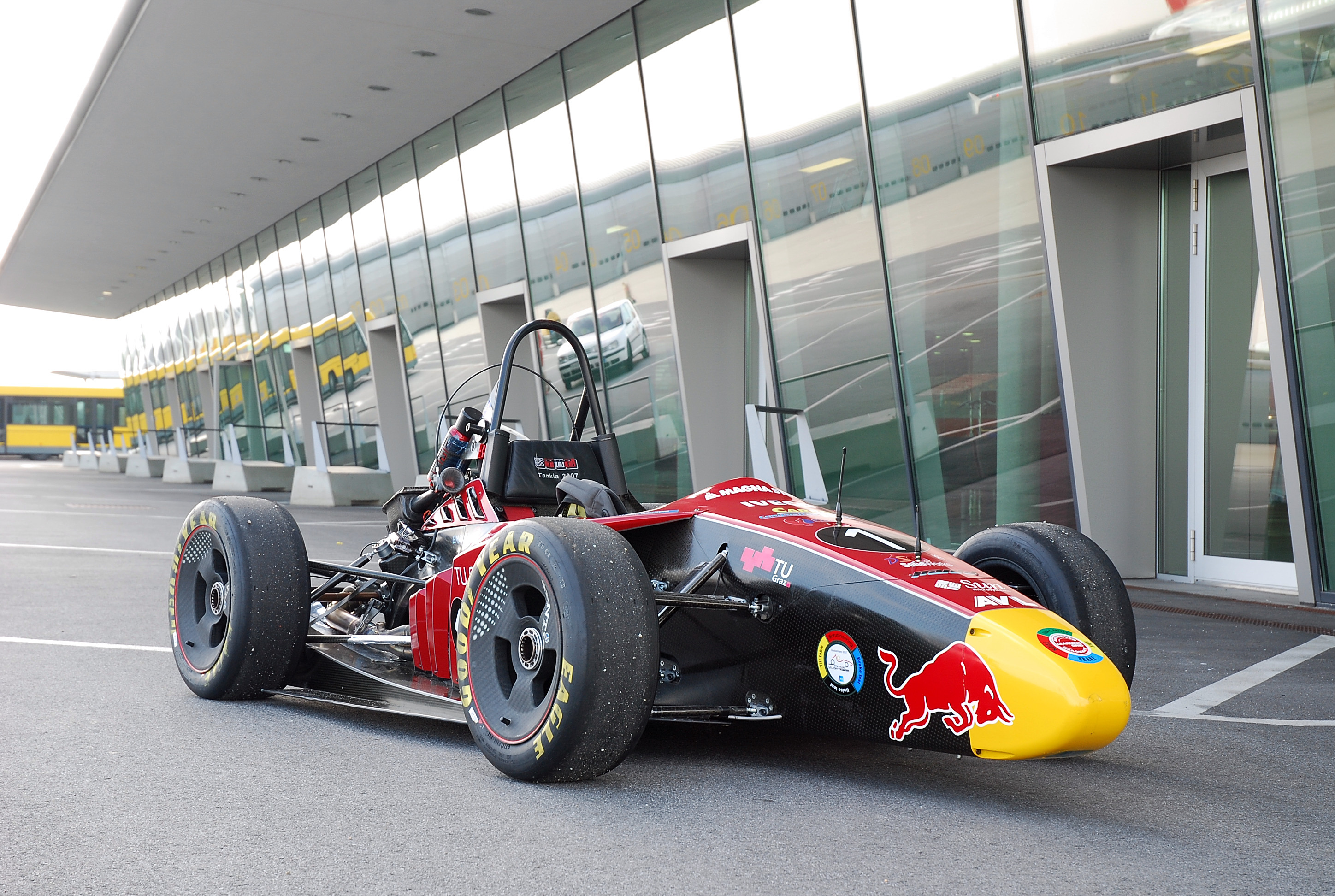
Tankia (2007)

In the Shell Eco-marathon Europe, team TERA TU Graz (formerly Team Eco-Racing Austria) twice won the category Prototype Battery Electric with its car Fennek which was named after the Fennec fox (2014, 2011).

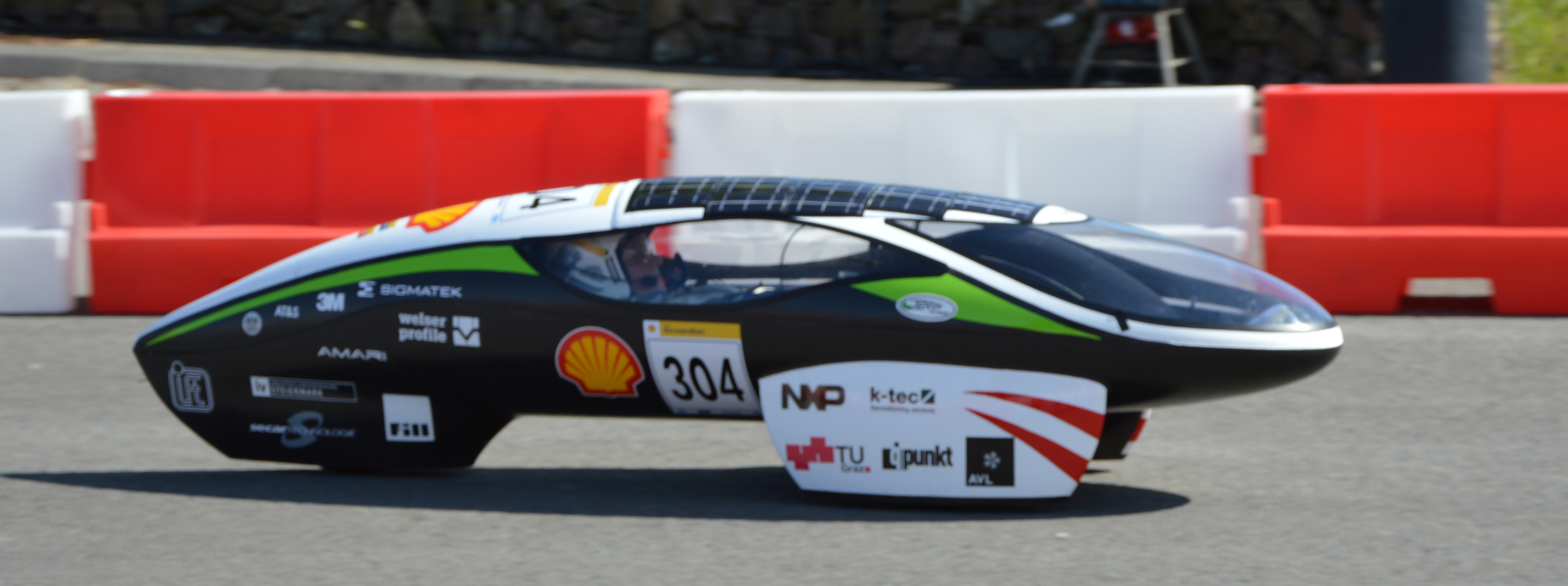
Fennek (2014)

In robotics, Graz University of Technology has two teams. Team TEDUSAR (short for Technology and EDucation for Urban Search And Rescue robots) is active in field robotics and competed at challenges like the RoboCup Rescue Robot League, the European Land-Robot Trial ELROB and the ENRICH European Robotics Hackathon. It also took part in different AMADEE Mars Analog Missions of the Austrian Space Forum. The university's RoboCup team GRIPS (short for Graz Robust and Intelligent Production System) competes in the logistics league and won the world championships in 2023. With regard to assistive technologies, the Graz BCI Racing Team – Mirage 91 explores Brain-computer interface systems and competed several times in Cybathlon. The team Autonomous Racing Graz competed in the Roborace Season Beta. In computer science, team LosFuzzys participates in the cybersecurity competition Capture the flag. Together with other Austrian university teams, they form team KuK Hofhackerei.

Graz University of Technology's Aerospace Team Graz develops rockets and competes in the European Rocketry Challenge where it took first place in 2023 and 2025. Also ASTG was part of the REXUS program in 2026 with its project APEX. The TU Graz Satellites team was involved in the development of the first Austrian satellite TUGSAT-1, which was part of the BRITE-Constellation launched in 2013, of OPS-SAT and of PRETTY. In synthetic biology, the NAWI Graz joint team of Graz University of Technology and the University of Graz was successful in the iGEM competition.

== Notable alumni ==
- Raimund Abraham (1933–2010), architect
- Silke Bühler-Paschen, physicist
- Günther Domenig (1934–2012), architect
- Artur Doppelmayr (1922–2017) businessman and ropeway pioneer
- Friedrich Emich (1860–1940), chemist
- Dietmar Feichtinger (born 1961), architect
- Friedrich St. Florian (1932–2024), architect
- Anselm Franz (1900–1994), pioneering jet engineer, inventor of the Jumo 004 and Lycoming T53 turbine engines
- Ernst Hiesmayr (1920–2006), architect, artist and former rector of the Technical University Vienna
- Karl Kordesch, fuel cell and battery designer
- Lisa Kaltenegger, (born 1977), astronomer
- Hans List, technical scientist and inventor, entrepreneur
- Hanns Malissa (1920–2010), chemist
- Otto Nußbaumer (1876–1930), physicist
- Franz Pacher (1919–2018), civil engineer and pioneer of modern tunneling
- Hubert Petschnigg (1913–1997), architect
- Ladislaus von Rabcewicz (1893–1975), engineer and pioneer of modern tunneling
- Alois Riedler (1850–1936), mechanical engineer
- Rudolf Sanzin (1874–1922), locomotive designer
- Friedrich Schmiedl (1902–1994), rocket scientist
- Friedrich St. Florian (1932–2024), architect
- Nikola Tesla, electrical and mechanical engineer, inventor (did not receive a degree and did not continue beyond the first semester of his third year, during which he stopped attending lectures)
- Karl von Terzaghi (1883–1963), civil engineer and founder of soil mechanics
- Luis Trenker (1892–1990), architect, artist and alpinist
- Werner S. Weiglhofer (1962–2003), mathematician and engineer
- Svitlana Winnikow (1919–1981), first woman professor of Mechanical Engineering-Engineering Mechanics at Michigan Technological University
- Gerhard J. Woeginger (1964–2022), mathematician and computer scientist
- Sisi Zlatanova, researcher in geospatial data, geographic information systems, and 3D modeling

== Partnerships ==
TU Graz has set up strategic partnerships with four universities:

- TU Darmstadt, Germany
- Technical University of Munich, Germany
- Tongji University, Shanghai, China
- University of Strathclyde, UK

It is also a member of CESAER as well as of ASEA-UNINET and the Eurasia-Pacific Uninet.

Graz University of Technology is one of nine members of the European University Alliance University Network for Innovation, Technology and Engineering Unite! within the European Universities initiative.

== Affiliates and shareholdings ==
TU Graz holds shares in more than 20 companies, mainly research centres like the Austrian Centre of Industrial Biotechnology or Virtual Vehicle. It also hosts the Austrian Centre for Electron Microscopy and Nanoanalysis and the headquarters of the Silicon Austria Labs.

== See also ==
- TU Austria
- International Conference of Physics Students
