= Bernd Michael Rode =

Austrian chemist (1946–2022)

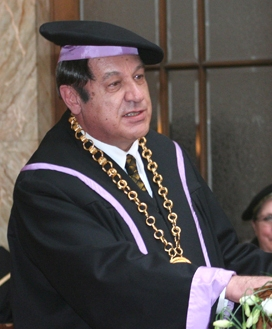
Bernd Michael Rode

Bernd Michael Rode (July 14, 1946 – August 28, 2022) was an Austrian professor of chemistry at the University of Innsbruck and founder of the Austrian-South-East-Asian Academic University Network (ASEA-UNINET). Prof. Rode retired in 2011 but remained actively involved in teaching and research as well as in the thesis supervision.

== Biography ==
In 1964 Bernd Michael Rode graduated from high school (“Akademisches Gymnasium Innsbruck”) and commenced studies in chemistry at the University of Innsbruck. In 1973 he received his Ph.D. degree in chemistry with sub auspiciis praesidentis from the University of Innsbruck.

In 1973 Prof. Rode started his career as an assistant professor at the Institute of Inorganic and Analytical Chemistry of the University of Innsbruck. After research stays in Germany (University of Stuttgart and University of Karlsruhe) he became an associate professor in Innsbruck in the year 1976. After spending a 1-year research stay at the University of Tokyo, Prof. Rode started his professorship at the Institute of Inorganic and Theoretical Chemistry at the University of Innsbruck. From 2006 to 2011 he was head of the Department of Theoretical Chemistry and head of the Institute for General Inorganic and Theoretical Chemistry.

One of Prof. Rode’s largest achievements was the foundation of the University Network ASEA-UNINET (Austrian South East Asian University Partnership Network) in 1994. The foundations for this network were laid by informal contacts between the University of Innsbruck and Thai Universities that date back to the 1970s. In the 1980s partnerships between the University of Innsbruck, the University of Vienna, the University of Agricultural Sciences Vienna, the Chulalongkorn University, the Mahidol University, the Kasetsart University and the Chiang Mai University were concluded. With the target to unify these bilateral partnership agreements into one multilateral network, Prof. Rode invited interested Universities from Austria, Indonesia, Thailand and Vietnam to participate in the first ASEA-UNINET Plenary Meeting in Ho Chi Minh City. In 1994 the network comprised 25 Universities from Austria, Thailand, Indonesia and Vietnam. As of June 2014, more than 70 Universities from 16 European and South-East-Asian countries participate in the network.

In addition to his scientific and networking activities, Prof. Rode served during the periods 1998–2001 and 2005–2008 as vice-president in the United Nations Commission on Science and Technology for Development (UNCSTD) representing the WEOG states EU, USA, Canada and Australia. In 2004 he became the first Austrian to serve as president in the United Nations Commission on Science and Technology for Development.

== Awards and decorations ==
For his commitment in Asian countries Prof. Rode has received many awards, amongst others the Honorary Doctorate Degree in Sciences of the Chulalongkorn University, Bangkok (1995), the Honorary Doctorate Degree in Sciences of the King Mongkut’s Institute of Technology, Ladkrabang, Bangkok (1998) and the Honorary Doctorate Degree in Sciences of the Gadjah Mada University, Yogyakarta, Indonesia (2000). In 2007 the King of Thailand, awarded Prof. Rode with the Knight Grand Cross (First Class), the Most Noble Order of the Crown of Thailand, for his activities and achievements to intensify the European-Asian scientific collaborations. In 2008 the Comenius University Bratislava awarded him an Honorary Doctorate Degree for his pioneer work in quantum chemistry studies of molecule and super molecule systems of ion solvation and molecular modelling of biomolecules and medicaments. In 2014 he was appointed Honorary President of ASEA-UNINET.

Overview most important Awards and Decorations:

- 1985 Goldenes Ehrenzeichen, Republic of Austria
- 1994 Austrian Decoration for Science and Art, Republic of Austria
- 1997 Honorary Member, Slovak Chemical Society
- 2003 Cross of Merits, State of Tyrol
- 2004 Cross of Merits, Austria
- 2007 Cross of Honours in Science and Arts first class, Republic of Austria
- 2008 Jan-Weber-Medal of the Slovak Pharmaceutical Society
- 2010 Sitara-e-Qaid-i-Azam (Civil decoration of Pakistan)
- 2011 Knight Grand Cross (First Class of The Most Exalted Order of the White Elephant with Slash)

According to the Theoretical Chemistry Genealogy Project, Bernd Michael Rode is the most successful doctoral thesis supervisor of German-speaking countries in the field of Theoretical Chemistry. Between 1976 and 2011 Prof. Rode has led not less than 70 students to their Ph.D. degree. Due to his close contacts to South-East-Asia many of them come from Asian countries.

== Research activities ==
Bernd M. Rode’s scientific achievements are reflected in seven monographies / books, more than 440 publications in international research journals and 30 book contributions. According to ISI Thomson's Web of Science citation report these contributions received more than 8300 citations (as of May 2014) with a Hirsch-index of 41.

Prof. Rode's research focus lies in Theoretical and Computational as well as Bioinorganic Chemistry. In detail his publications emphasise on the following aspects:

- Quantum chemical calculations of molecular and supermolecular systems,
- Ab initio Monte Carlo and MD simulations of liquids / solutions,
- Electrolyte solution structure,
- Ultrafast Dynamics of solutes,
- Molecular Modelling of biomolecules and drugs,
- QSAR / QSPR,
- Chemical Evolution of Peptides/ Proteins and Origin of Life

=== Theoretical chemistry ===
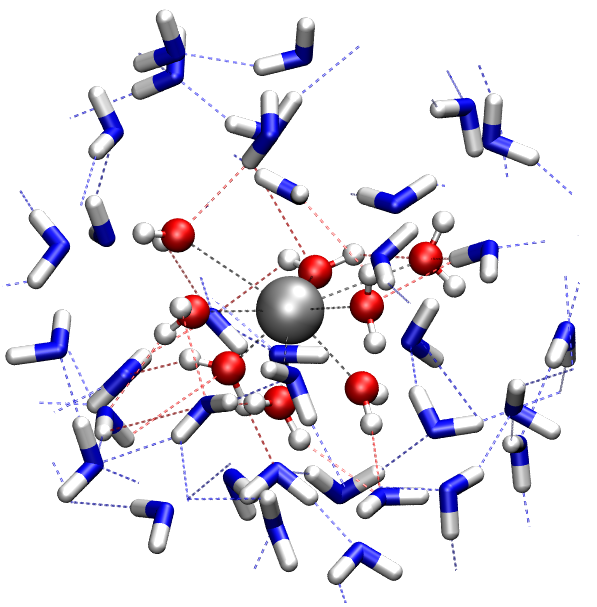
Example of a hybrid quantum mechanical/molecular mechanical simulation of aqueous Sn(II) performed by Rode et al. Oxygen atoms of first shell molecules are shown in red. The influence of the lone electron pair of Sn(II) on the hydration structure is clearly visible.

Although Prof. Rode's initial research activities were in field of inorganic chemistry, he soon extended his expertise into the rapidly developing field of theoretical and computational chemistry. Whereas in the beginning most studies focused on quantum chemical computations of a broad range of chemical systems, later application focused on the application of chemical simulation techniques such as Monte Carlo and molecular dynamics, mostly in the context of solution chemistry.

A particular notable contribution of Prof. Rode's research is the development and application of hybrid quantum mechanical/molecular mechanical simulation techniques, focusing on a broad range of problems in solution chemistry. In 2004 an improved technique known as quantum mechanical charge field molecular dynamics explicitly aimed at the treatment of solvated systems has been developed in Prof. Rode's research group. During the last years the application of this technique enabled accurate simulations of ionic compounds and organic species as well as coordination complexes in aqueous solution. His most recent research is focussed on the lanthanoid ions in aqueous solution.

=== Chemical evolution ===
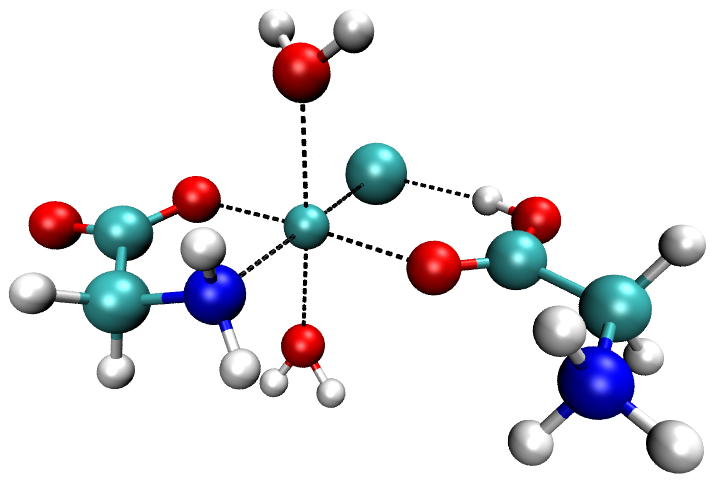
Structure of the salt induced peptide formation complex with one chelating and one end-on coordinated glycine ligand, one chloride ligand and two axial water molecules obtained via energy minimization at Hartree-Fock level in implicit solvent.

Prof. Rode's second main field of research lies in the area of bioinorganic chemistry, in particular abiogenesis. At the end of the 1980s Prof. Rode and his coworkers discovered the salt induced peptide formation reaction as a simple route to synthesis peptides from amino acid monomers under prebiotic conditions. Instead of enzymes transition metals act as catalyst to induce peptide formation in highly concentrated aqueous NaCl solution, with copper (II) showing the highest catalytic activity. Typically, evaporation cycle experiments have been carried out to mimic day/night cycles on shore and in lagoons, thereby generating supersaturated solutions. Since such solutions have a tendency to dilute themselves, the thermodynamic and kinetic unfavourable peptide formation reaction is promoted. The research conducted by Prof. Rode investigates the properties of the salt induced peptide formation reaction under various conditions, highlighting also its possible connection to biohomochirality. Furthermore, Prof. Rode also carried out Miller–Urey experiments, taking new insights of the composition of the primordial atmosphere into account. It was shown that peptides may also form in a neutral atmosphere (CO_{2}/N_{2}/H_{2}O) subject to electric discharges.

=== Molvision® ===
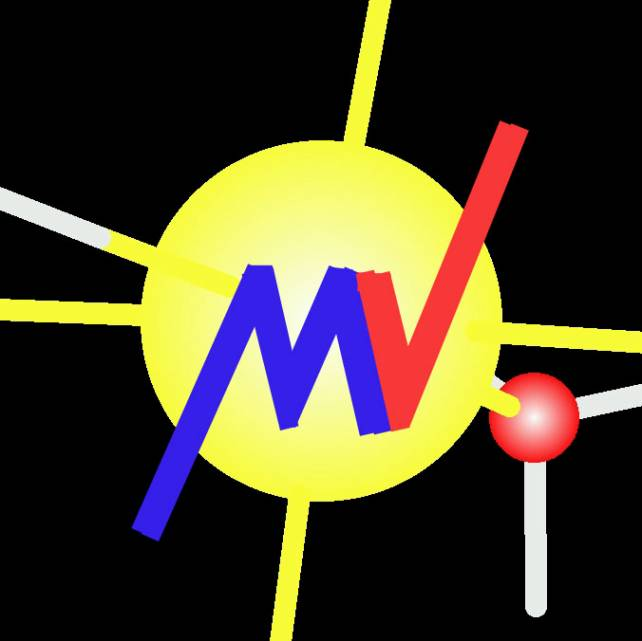
The Molvision® Logo

Together with his Ph.D. student Hung Tung Tran Prof. Rode developed the practical and flexible visualization software Molvision® capable of interactively analyzing dynamic simulation data. In 2003 Dr. Tran was awarded with a European Innovation Award for the development of this program.

== Publications ==
- Tongraar, A.; Liedl, K. R.; Rode, Bernd M. (1997);"Solvation of Ca2+ In Water Studied By Born-Oppenheimer Ab-Initio QM/MM Dynamics"; J. Phys. Chem. A 1997, 101(35), p. 6299-6309,DOI: 10.1021/jp970963t.
- Rode, Bernd M.; Schwenk, Christian F., Tongraar, Anan (2004); "Structure and Dynamics of Hydrated Ions - New Insights through Quantum Cechanical Simulation"; J. Mol. Liq. 2004, 110(1-3), pp. 105–122. DOI: 10.1016/j.molliq.2003.09.016.
- Hofer, Thomas; Pribil, Andreas; Randolf, Bernhard; Rode, Bernd M. (2005); "Structure and dynamics of solvated Sn(II) in aqueous solution - an ab initio QM/MM MD approach", J. Am. Chem. Soc. 2005, 127(41), p. 14231-14238. DOI:10.1021/ja052700f.
- Rode, Bernd M.; Schwenk, Christian; Hofer, Thomas; Randolf, Bernhard (2005); "Coordination and ligand exchange dynamics of solvated metal ions"; Coord. Chem. Rev. 2005, 249(24), pp. 2993-–3006. DOI: doi:10.1016/j.ccr.2005.03.032.
- Rode, Bernd M.; Hofer, Thomas (2006); "How to Access Structure and Dynamics of Solutions: The Capabilities of Computational Methods", Pure Appl. Chem. 2006, 78(3), pp. 525–539. DOI: 10.1351/pac200678030525.
- Rode, Bernd M.; Hofer, Thomas; Randolf, Bernhard; Schwenk, Christian; Xenides, Demetrios; Vchirawongkwin, Viwat(2006); "Ab initio Quantum Mechanical Charge Field (QMCF) Molecular Dynamics - A QM/MM - MD Procedure for Accurate Simulations of Ions and Complexes"; Theor. Chem. Acc. 2006, 115(2-3), pp. 77–85. DOI: 10.1007/s00214-005-0049-1.
- Hofer, Thomas S.; Randolf, Bernhard R.; Rode, Bernd M. (2008); "Molecular Dynamics Simulation Methods including Quantum Effects"; In: Solvation Effects on Molecules and Biomolecules, Canuto, Sylvio (Eds.), ISBN 978-1-4020-8269-6, Springer, Heidelberg 2008, pp. 247–278.
- Rode, Bernd M.; Hofer, Thomas S.; Pribil, Andreas B.; Randolf, Bernhard R. (2010); "Simulations of Liquids and Solutions Based on Quantum Mechanical Forces"; In: Theoretical and Computational Inorganic Chemistry, van Eldik, Rudi; Harvey, Jeremy (Eds.), ISBN 978-0-12-380874-5, Elsevier, Amsterdam 2010, pp. 143–175.
- Hofer, Thomas S.; Pribil, Andreas B.; Randolf, Bernhard R.; Rode, Bernd M.; "Ab Initio Quantum Mechanical Charge Field Molecular Dynamics - A Nonparametrized First-Principle Approach to Liquids and Solutions"; In: Advances in Quantum Chemistry, Sabin, John R.; Brändas, Erkki (Eds.), ISBN 978-0-12-380898-1, Elsevier, Amsterdam 2010, 213–246.
- Jakschitz, Thomas; Fitz, Daniel; Rode, Bernd Michael (2012); "The origin of first peptides on earth: from amino acids to homochiral biomolecules"; In: Genesis - In The Beginning, Joseph Seckbach (Edp.), ISBN 978-94-007-2940-7, Springer, Dordrecht 2012, pp. 469–489.
- Lutz, Oliver M. D.; Messner, Christoph B.; Hofer, Thomas S.; Glätzle, Matthias; Huck, Christian W.; Bonn, Günther K.; Rode, Bernd M.; "Combined Ab Initio Computational and Infrared Spectroscopic Study of the cis- and trans-Bis(glycinato)copper(II) Complexes in Aqueous Environment"; J. Phys. Chem. Lett. 2013, 4, p. 1502-1506. DOI: 10.1021/jz400288c.
- Schwendinger, M. G.; Rode, Bend M. (1990); "Copper-Catalyzed Amino Acid Condensation in Water - A Simple Possible Way of Prebiotic Peptide Formation"; Origins Life Evol. Biosphere 1990, 20(5), pp. 401–410. DOI: 10.1007/BF01808134.
- Schwendinger, M. G.; Rode, Bend M.(1998); "Possible Role of Copper and Sodium Chloride in Prebiotic Evolution of Peptides"; Anal. Sci. 1989, 5(4), pp. 411–414. DOI: 10.2116/analsci.5.411.
- Plankensteiner, Kristof; Reiner, Hannes; Schranz, Benjamin; Rode, Bernd M. (2004); "Prebiotic formation of amino acids in a neutral atmosphere by electric discharge"; Angew. Chem. Int. Ed. 2004, 43, pp. 1886–1888.
- Fitz, Daniel; Reiner, Hannes; Rode, Bernd M. (2007); "Chemical evolution toward the origin of life"]; Pure Appl. Chem. 2007, 79(12), pp. 2101–2117. DOI: 10.1351/pac200779122101.
- Fitz, Daniel; Jakschitz, Thomas; Rode, Bernd M. (2011); "Salt-Induced Peptide Formation in Chemical Evolution: Building Blocks Before RNA - Potential of Peptide Splicing Reactions"; In: Origins of Life: The Primal Self-Organization, Egel, Richard; Lankenau, Dirk-Henner; Mulkidjanian, Armen Y. (Eds.), ISBN 978-3-642-21624-4, Springer, Heidelberg, Berlin 2011, pp. 109–127.
- Jakschitz, Thomas A.; Rode, Bernd M. (2012); "Chemical Evolution from simple inorganic compounds to chiral peptides"; Chem. Soc. Rev. 2012, 41(16), pp. 5484–5489. DOI: 10.1039/C2CS35073D.
- Rode, Bernd M.; Plankensteiner, Kristof (2013); "Prebiotic Peptides"; In: Handbook of Biologically Active Peptides, Second Edition, Abba J. Kastin (Eds.), ISBN 978-012-3850959, Elsevier, Amsterdam 2013, pp. 1899–1903.
