= Silke Bühler-Paschen =

Austrian physicist

- Education: Graz University of Technology (Diploma, 1992); École Polytechnique Fédérale de Lausanne (PhD, 1995)
- Scientific career
- Fields: solid-state physics
- Workplaces: TU Wien

Silke Bühler-Paschen is a German-Austrian solid-state physicist and has been professor for physics at TU Wien, Austria since 2005.

== Education ==
Bühler-Paschen studied physics at Graz University of Technology and earned her diploma in 1992. In 1995 she earned her PhD with her thesis titled "Electron transport in polymer composites" at École Polytechnique Fédérale de Lausanne.

== Career ==
Bühler-Paschen worked as a postdoctoral researcher at ETH Zurich between 1995 and 1998 and as a group leader at Max Planck Institute for Chemical Physics of Solids in Dresden starting in 1999, where she also became an assistant professor in 2003. In 2005, Bühler-Paschen became the first female full professor of physics at TU Wien, and she became chair of the institute for solid state physics in 2007.

Bühler-Paschen served as visiting professor at Nagoya University in 2001/2002 and at Rice University in 2016/2017. She served on the ERC Starting Grant peer review panel in Condensed Matter Physics in 2019. Bühler-Paschen's research was funded by the European Research Council and the German Research Foundation (Deutsche Forschungsgemeinschaft). She studied complex metallic alloys within an EU-funded "Network of Excellence". Bühler-Paschen is on the Low Temperature Section board of Heidelberg University's Condensed Matter Division, as well as the board of European Forum Alpbach and the advisory board of the low-temperature research institute of the Bavarian Academy of Sciences and Humanities. She was also on the European Physical Society's EPS Condensed Matter Board in 2019.

== Research ==
Bühler-Paschen studies new materials, typically by growing high-quality single crystals, which are then characterized for their structure and composition, and whose physical properties are typically measured at low temperatures. Bühler-Paschen's research focuses on strongly correlated and thermoelectric materials. She studies magnetism and superconductivity in heavy fermion systems, as well as materials exhibiting the thermoelectric effect.

During her time in Dresden, Bühler-Paschen's research started to focus on materials with cage-like crystal structures called clathrates with respect to their potential applications as thermoelectrics. Later, she discovered how the temperature-dependent rattling behavior of caged cerium atoms in such clathrates can stabilize the Kondo effect at unusually high temperatures, as well as the first observed collapse of the Kondo effect due to three-dimensional quantum fluctuations.

Bühler-Paschen contributed to the first identification of Weyl fermions in a strongly correlated Weyl-Kondo semimetal. She realized the individual toggling of different electronic degrees of freedom in correlated electron systems. Bühler-Paschen investigated metallic materials whose electrical resistance exhibits unusual behavior with varying temperatures, which is related to superconductivity and based on quantum-critical charge fluctuations.

== Awards and honors ==
- 2009: ERC Advanced Grant
- 2015: Fellow of the American Physical Society, nominated by the Division of Condensed Matter Physics

== Personal life ==
Bühler-Paschen grew up living in Brazil, Germany, the Netherlands, and Austria. She practiced gymnastics between the ages of 8 and 18 and was discovered as a model at the age of 14. She has three children and her husband is also a physicist.
