= Austrian Centre for Electron Microscopy and Nanoanalysis =

The Austrian Centre for Electron Microscopy and Nanoanalysis (short: FELMI-ZFE) is a cooperation between the Institute of Electron Microscopy and Nanoanalysis (FELMI) of the Graz University of Technology (TUG) and the Graz Centre for Electron Microscopy (ZFE), which is a member of Austrian Cooperative Research (ACR) and run by the non-profit association for the promotion of electron microscopy. It is located at the “Neue Technik Steyrergasse” campus in Graz.

The FELMI-ZFE is offering both research and services, to interested partners from academia and industry, using advanced electron microscopic methods for both structural and chemical characterization.

== History ==
The acquisition process of the first electron microscope of the Graz University of Technology was started by a donation from industry in 1949. The next year a research group, headed by Fritz Grasenick, was established. Finally, the first electron microscope (“Übermikroskop UEM100” by Siemens & Halske) was bought in 1951 and the opening ceremony was attended by Ernst Ruska, Werner Glaser and Otto Wolf. Despite the Graz University of Technology providing rooms and infrastructure, from the very beginning supplementary income from services research provide for industry was necessary to help cover the high operating and investment cost. Due to the larger interest in measurements and the high utilization of the instrument, the group soon need to expand its personal and look to acquire need microscopes. In order to concentrate all funding sources the non-profit association for the promotion of electron microscopy (Verein zur Förderung der Elektronenmikroskopie und Feinstrukturforschung) was founded in 1959 under the direction of the governor of Styria Josef Krainer senior. The Graz Centre of Electron Microscopy (ZFE) was attached to this non-profit. The combined institutions grew over the years, where the combined role of the head of the university institute and the head of the ZFE in one person played a crucial role in the development of a tight interconnection between fundamental research and application. In 2011 the to this date most expansive and impressive acquisition was possible, a at that time worldwide unique STEM. With the ASTEM (Austrian Scanning Transmission Electron Microscope) magnification of more than one million became possible, this enables atomic resolution. In addition, with an investment volume of 4.5 Mio. Euro, the ASTEM was one of the largest scientific infrastructure investments in Austria.

=== Head of institute ===
1951–1981	Fritz Grasenick
1982–1988	Herwig Horn
1989–1999	Wolfgang Geymayer
2000–2020	Ferdinand Hofer
2021-	Gerald Kothleitner

== Organizational structure, Research & Services ==
Approximately 50 people work at the FELMI-ZFE with the number varying somewhat due to dissertations and research projects. In addition roughly 300 scientist visit the FELMI-ZFE each year.

=== International collaboration ===
There are standing collaboration with approximately 30 research institutes and 140 companies. In addition, since the establishment of the ASTEM, the FELMI-ZFE is part of ESTEEM3 (Enabling Science and Technology through European Electron Microscopy), which is a network of 14 electron microscopy institutes in Europe.

=== Research & Services ===
Five groups work on four main topics of research:

- Nanoanalytic of materials
- Functional Nanostructuring
- 3D and in situ measurements
- Polymers and biological materials

=== Instruments ===
- Scanning electron microscopy (SEM)
- Transmission electron microscopy (TEM)
- Infrared- and Raman-microscopy (IR/Raman)
- Focused-Ion-Beam-Microscopy (FIB)
- Atomic forces microscopy (AFM)
- X-ray diffraction (XRD)
- Sample preparation

=== Teaching and Education ===
In the academic year 2019/2020 approximately 600 students visited lectures and lab exercises of the Institute of Electron Microscopy and Nanoanalysis. The courses offered are on the topics of fundamental physics, material analysis, electron microscopy and nano-manufacturing. In addition apprenticeships for both lab-technician and media technology are offered.
