= Svitlana Winnikow =

Engineer

- Born: Swetlana Redtko-Redtschenko; August 14, 1919; Luzk, Ukraine
- Died: October 28, 1981 (aged 62); Marshfield, Wisconsin
- Education: University of Zagreb (BS) Graz University of Technology (MS) University of Illinois (PhD)
- Occupations: Professor, engineer
- Spouse: Mistislaw Winnikow

Svitlana Winnikow (14 August 1919 - 28 October 1981; born Swetlana Redtko-Redtschenko) was an engineer in Austria, Australia, and Canada before arriving in America in 1960. She was the first woman professor of Mechanical Engineering-Engineering Mechanics at Michigan Technological University and the area director providing leadership for undergraduate and graduate programs for the energy thermo-fluids research group.

== Early life and education ==
Swetlana Redtko-Redtschenko was born on 14 August 1919 in Luzk in what is now Ukraine but was declared Poland just weeks after her birth. She studied mechanical engineering at the University of Zagreb before the Second World War. From 1945-46 she studied at Graz University of Technology in Austria, and in 1947, she sat for and passed the second state examination in mechanical engineering, making her the first woman awarded the title of a graduate engineer at TU Graz. In 1947, she married Mistislaw Winnikow and took her husband's surname Winnikow.

== Career ==
Due to the economic crisis in Austria, Winnikow emigrated to Australia at the beginning of the 1950s, after working for a consulting bureau in Austria. She worked in the Department of Works in Australia and was involved in the development of diesel engines as well as in the monitoring and control of new laboratory facilities and testing equipment.

Around 1960, Winnikow emigrated to the United States, where, in 1965, she became the first woman to earn a PhD in Engineering at the University of Illinois where she was a member of the local Scientific Research Honor Society, Sigma Xi. Her dissertation was on "Motion and Heat Transfer of Droplets at Large Reynolds and Peclet Number.

Winnikow's early research involved diesel engine design before arriving at Michigan Technological University to lead research efforts on experimental and analytical fluid mechanics.

Winnikow taught at the University of Illinois and the University of Calgary. In 1967, she was appointed the first female professor of engineering at the Department of Mechanical Engineering at Michigan Technological University, teaching fluid mechanics and thermodynamics. She became Area Director of the Energy Thermo-Fluids Group, and developed an active research and publication career at this university. She chaired her department until 1981. She was known for her care for her students.

Winnikow's professional memberships included the Association of Professional Engineers of Alberta, Canada, Engineering Institute of Canada, American Association of University Professors, University of Illinois Alumni Association, and American Society of Mechanical Engineers.

== Death and legacy ==
Svitlana Winnikow died after a short and unexpected illness on October 28, 1981 at St Joseph Hospital in Marshfield, Wisconsin.

Shortly after her death, in November 1981, Michigan Technological University adopted a Special Tribute for her service and honored her request to apply $150,000 of her personal assets (99% of her estate) toward funding an endowed fellowship to graduate students studying thermo-fluid mechanics.
