= Ernst Hiesmayr =

Austrian architect and artist (1920–2006)

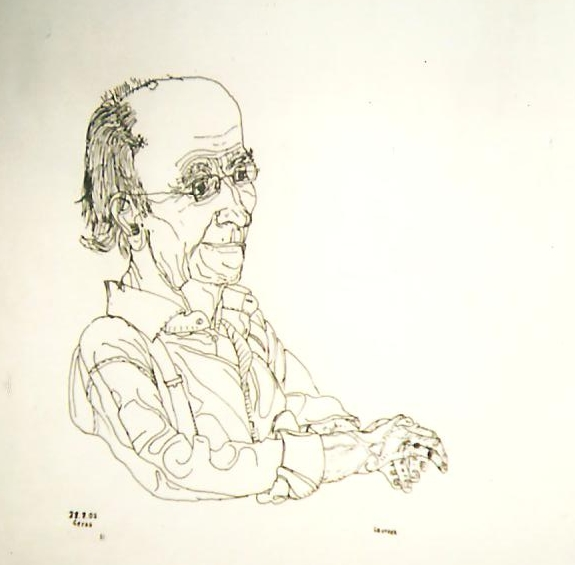
Ernst Hiesmayr (2003), portrait by Matthias Laurenz Gräff (Collection of Jörg Michael Hiesmayr, Vienna)

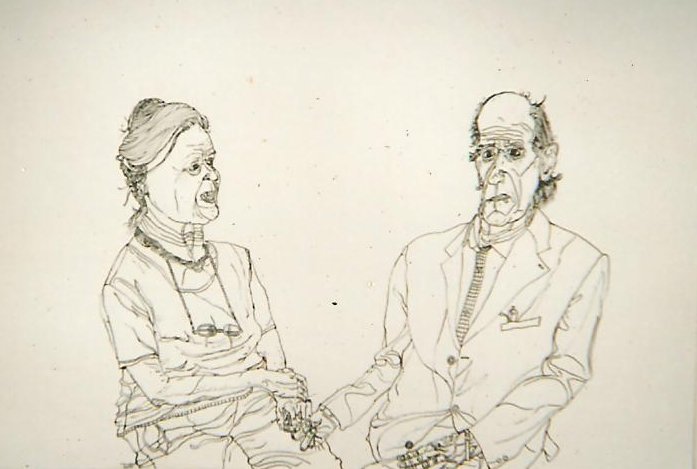
Ernst Hiesmayr with his wife Isoldege Hiesmayr (née Moosbrugger (2003), portrait by Matthias Laurenz Gräff (Collection of Jörg Michael Hiesmayr, Vienna)

Ernst Hiesmayr (11 July 1920 in Innsbruck – 6 August 2006 in Bregenz) was an Austrian architect, artist and former rector of the Technical University Vienna.

== Life ==
As a student in his high school years Ernst Hiesmayr already worked on construction sites, where he appropriated his material, construction and practical orientation. During the Second World War, he worked at the labor service and as an officer in the German Wehrmacht. Between 1945 and 1948 Hiesmayr studied architecture at the Graz University of Technology in the class of Friedrich Zotter.

After his studies Hiesmayr worked as a freelance architect in Tyrol, Vorarlberg and Vienna. In 1967 Hiesmayr received his doctorate at the Technical University in Vienna. In 1968 he was appointed full professor in the area of the Institute of Building Construction. In 1973 he became Dean of the Faculty of Civil Engineering and Architecture. From 1975 to 1977 he was Rector of the University of Technology Vienna. In 1988 Hiesmayr was honored with Honorary Senator dignity. He was from 1994 to 2006 member of the Academy of Arts Berlin.

Ernst Hiesmayr was married to Isolde Moosbrugger. He was painted by Maria Lassnig and drawn by Matthias Laurenz Gräff.

== Work (selection) ==
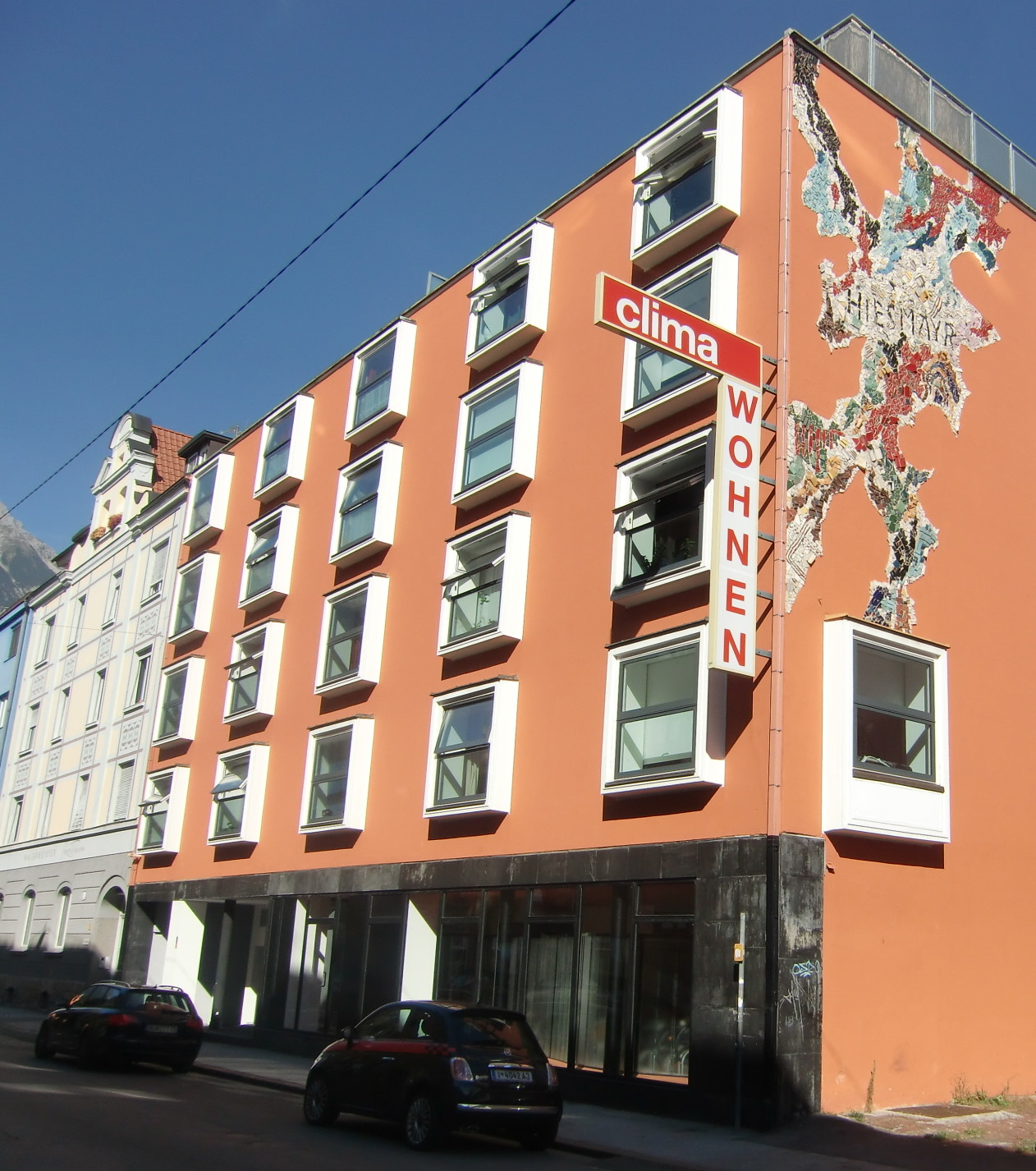
Hotel Clima in Innsbruck

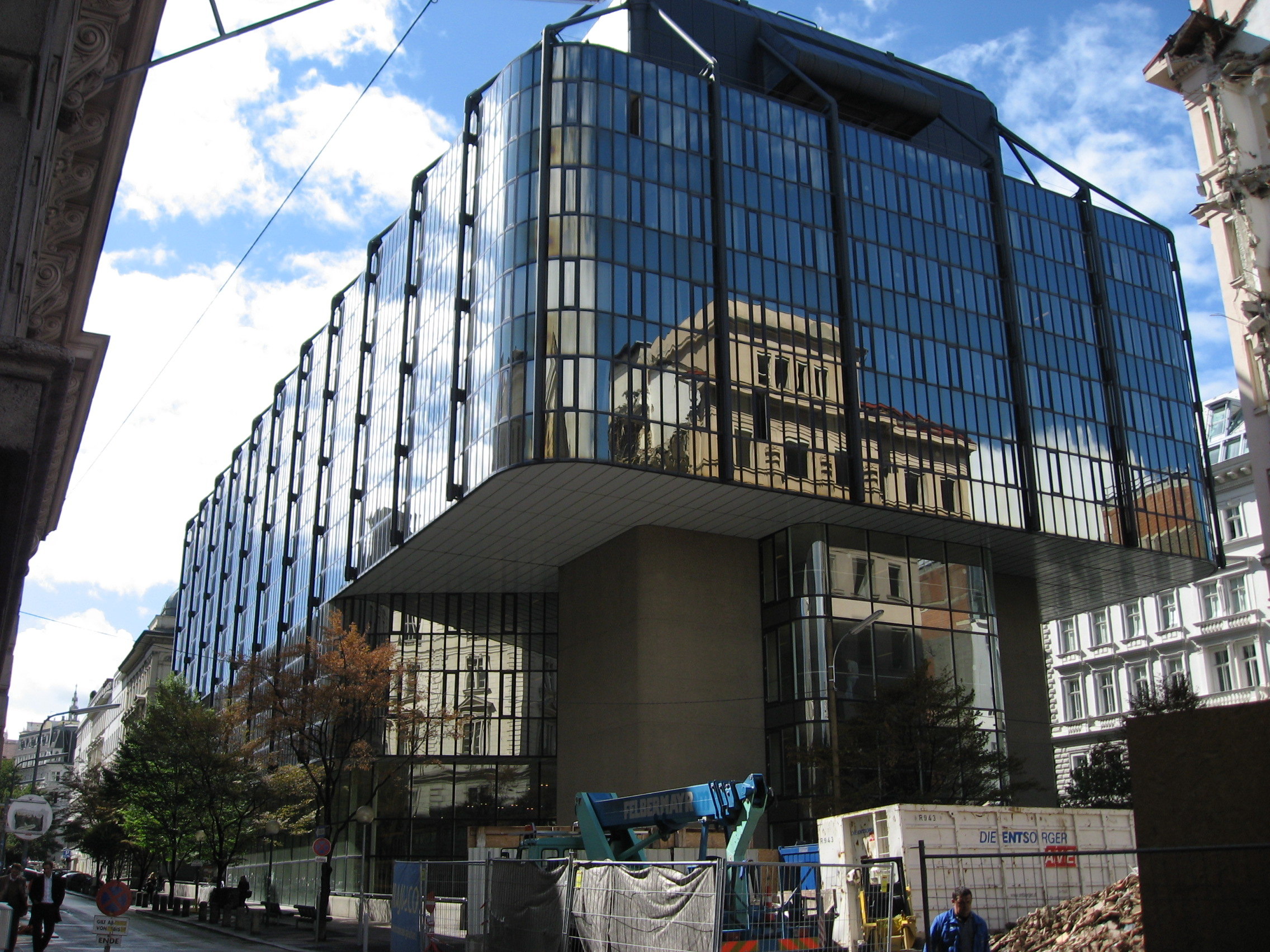
Juridicum, University of Vienna

- 1951 – Trade chamber Vorarlberg
- 1959 – Hotel Clima in Wien and Innsbruck
- 1963 bis 1965 – Villenhotel Bockkeller, Vienna
- 1967 – WIFI Dornbirn
- 1968 bis 1984 – Juridicum der Universität in Wien
- 1971 – Office block Honeywell, Vienna
- 1985 – Girozentrale-modification, Vienna

== Publications (selection) ==
- 1991 – "Einfache Häuser“
- 1991 – "Das Karge als Inspiration“
- 1996 – "Juridicum“
- 1999 – "Analytische Bausteine“

== Awards (selection) ==
- 1975: Preis der Stadt Wien für Architektur
- 1978: Grand Decoration of Honour for Services to the Republic of Austria in Gold
- 1980: European Steel prize
- 1988: University of Vienna, Senator by honor
- 1999: University of Music and Performing Arts Vienna, Gold medal
- 2000: Johann Joseph Ritter von Prechtl-Medaille, TU Wien

== Links ==
- Website about Ernst Hiesmayr
- Literature by and about Ernst Hiesmayr in the German National Library catalogue
- Ernst Hiesmayr at archINFORM
- Biography of Ernst Hiesmayr (Academy of Arts Berlin)
