= TU Austria =

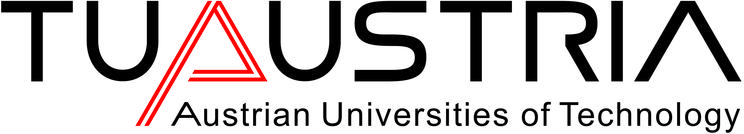
- Established: 2010
- Academic staff: 9,000
- Students: 46,000
- Location: Vienna, Graz, Leoben, Austria
- Website: tuaustria.at

TU Austria is an association of three Austrian technological institutions: the TU Wien, the Graz University of Technology, and the University of Leoben. The association was founded in 2010, and together the universities in the field of science and engineering have more than 46,000 students, 560 million euros total assets and 9,000 employees.

== See also ==
- TU Wien
- Graz University of Technology
- University of Leoben
