= Orders, decorations, and medals of the Austrian states =

The orders, decorations, and medals of the Austrian states, in which each states of Austria has devised a system of orders and awards to honour residents for actions or deeds that benefit their local community or state, are in turn subsumed within the Austrian honours system. Each state sets their own rules and criteria on eligibility and also how each medal is awarded and presented. Most of the orders allow for the recipient to wear their orders in public.

== State orders ==
| State | Name | Established | Classes | Note |
|---|---|---|---|---|
| Burgenland | Badge of honour of Burgenland | 1961 | 7 | |
| Carinthia | Order of Carinthia | | 2 | |
| Carinthia | Badge of honour of Carinthia | | 3 | |
| Lower Austria | Ring of honour of Lower Austria | 1952 | 1 | |
| Lower Austria | Badge of honour of Lower Austria | 1974 | 12 | |
| Salzburg | Ring of honour of Salzburg | | 1 | |
| Salzburg | Badge of honour of Salzburg | 2001 | 5 | |
| Styria | Ring of honour of Styria | | 1 | |
| Styria | Badge of honour of Styria | | 5 | |
| Tyrol | Ring of honour of Tyrol | | 1 | |
| Tyrol | Badge of honour of Tyrol | 1955 | 1 | |
| Tyrol | Badge of merit of Tyrol | 1964 | 1 | |
| Tyrol | Medal of merit of Tyrol | 1964 | 1 | |
| Tyrol | Tyrolean Eagle-Order | 1970 | 3 | |
| Upper Austria | Badge of honour of Upper Austria | 1982 | 7 | |
| Vienna | Badge of honour of the state of Vienna | | 7 | |
| Vorarlberg | Badge of honour of Vorarlberg | 1963 | 7 | |
| Vorarlberg | Badge of merit of Vorarlberg | 1978 | 2 | |
| Vorarlberg | Order of Montfort | 1985 | 3 | |

== See also ==
- Orders, decorations, and medals of Austria
