= Beatrix Hiesmayr =

Austrian physicist

Beatrix C. Hiesmayr (born 1975) is an Austrian physicist who studies quantum mechanics and quantum information theory from a combination of theoretical and experimental points of view. She is a privatdozent at the University of Vienna, where she heads the Quantum Particle Workgroup.

== Education and career ==
Hiesmayr is originally from Vienna, and was a student in physics at the University of Vienna, completing her doctorate in 2002.

Her postdoctoral studies have included positions at the Autonomous University of Barcelona, Masaryk University, Sofia University, Slovak Academy of Sciences, and University of Salzburg.

== Recognition ==
Hiesmayr's doctoral dissertation won both the Bank Austria Award and the Victor Franz Hess Award of the Austrian Physical Society.

She was elected to the European Academy of Sciences and Arts in 2019.
