= TU Wien =

University in Vienna, Austria

Coordinates: 48°11′56″N 16°22′12″E

- Technische Universität Wien
- Motto: Technik für Menschen
- Motto in English: Technology for people
- Type: Public
- Established: November 6, 1815; 210 years ago
- Founder: Emperor Francis I of Austria
- Affiliations: ATHENS; EUA; EURECOM; TIME
- Budget: €271 million (2019)
- Rector: Jens Schneider
- Faculty: 4,228 (2020)
- Administrative staff: 1,271 (2020)
- Students: 26,654 (2021)
- Location: Vienna, Austria
- Campus: Urban
- Website: tuwien.at
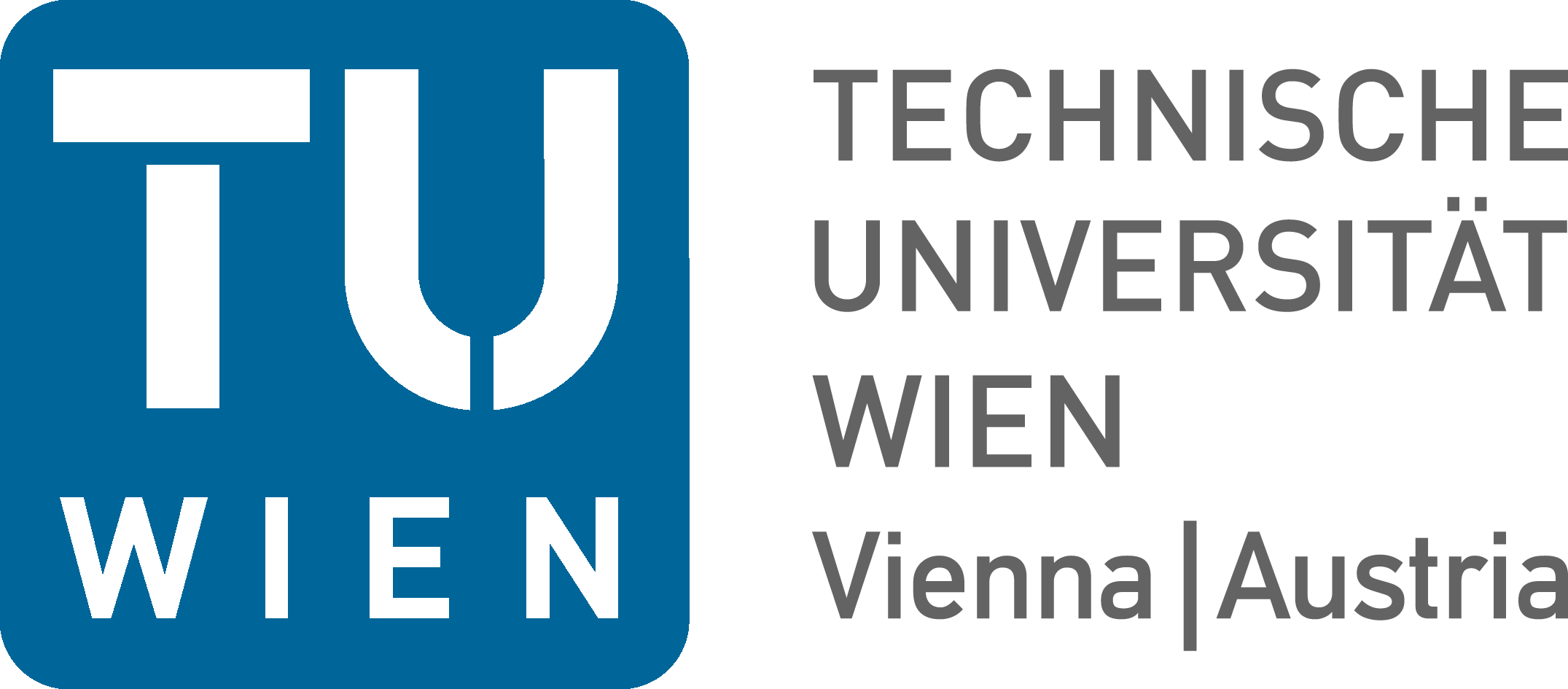

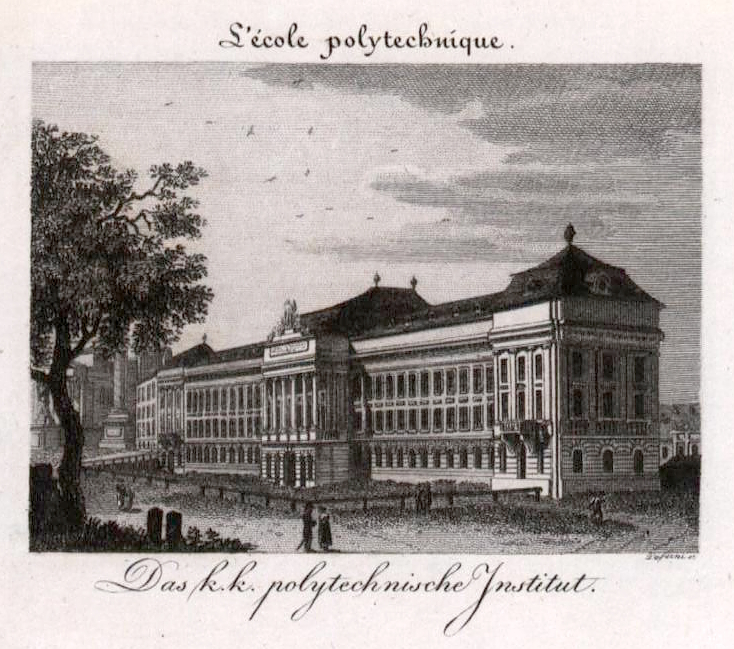
Imperial-Royal Polytechnic Institute (now the TU Wien) in 1823

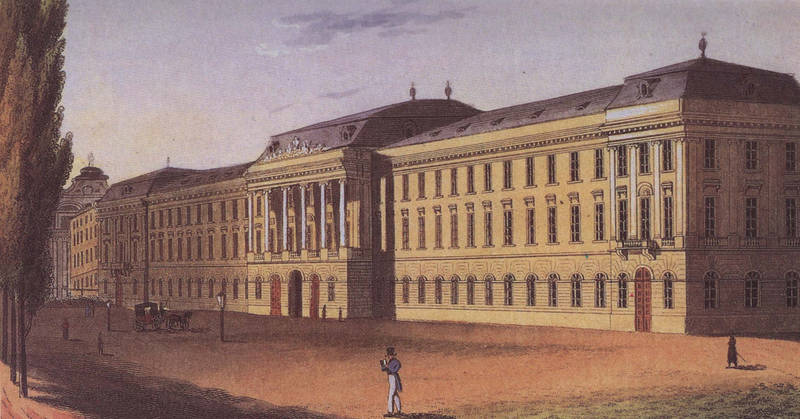
The main building of the Vienna at the Karlsplatz in 1825

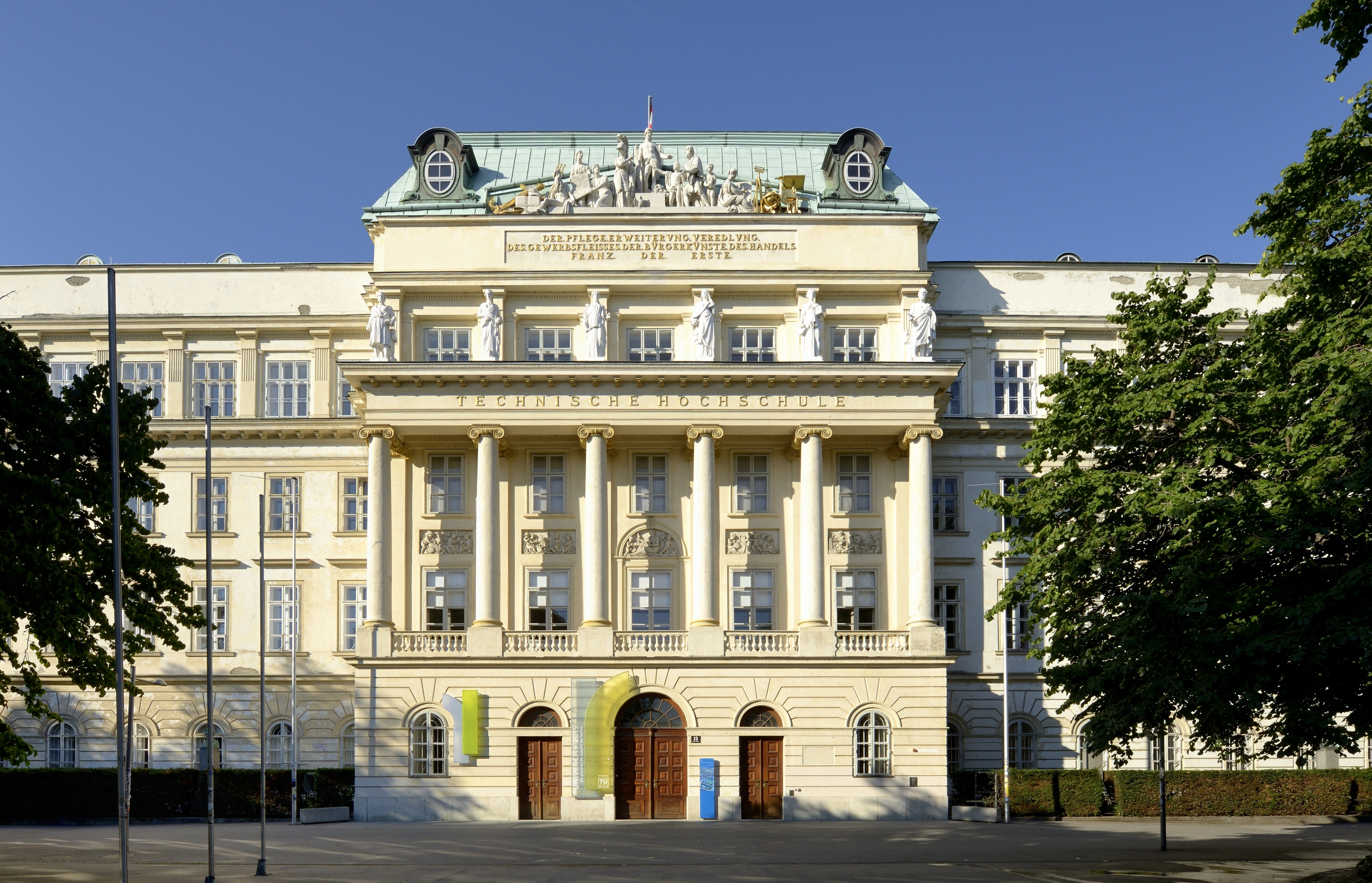
Main building of the TU Wien in 2012

TU Wien (German: Technische Universität Wien) is a public research university in Vienna, Austria.

The university's teaching and research are focused on engineering, computer science, and natural sciences. It currently has about 28,100 students (29% women), eight faculties, and about 5,000 staff members (3,800 academics).

== History ==
The institution was founded in 1815 by Emperor Francis I of Austria as the k.k. Polytechnisches Institut (English: Imperial-Royal Polytechnic Institute). The first rector was Johann Joseph von Prechtl. It was renamed the Technische Hochschule (English: Technical College) in 1872. In 1975, it was renamed Technische Universität Wien (English: TU Wien).

== Academic reputation ==
As a university of technology, TU Wien covers a wide spectrum of scientific concepts from abstract pure research and the fundamental principles of science to applied technological research and partnership with industry.

TU Wien is ranked #190 by the QS World University Ranking, #406 by the Center of World University Rankings, and it is positioned among the best 251-300 higher education institutions globally by the Times Higher Education World University Rankings. The computer science department has been consistently ranked among the top 100 in the world by the QS World University Ranking and The Times Higher Education World University Rankings respectively.

Ranking	2019	2018	2017	2016	2015	2014	2013	2012
QS World University Rankings	199		182	183	197	246	264	274
QS Faculty Rankings: Engineering & Technology	127	142	115	93	93	91	132	-
QS Subject Rankings: Mechanical Engineering	151-200	151-200	101-150	101-150	151-200	151-200	151-200	-
QS Subject Rankings: Electrical Engineering	101-150	101-150	101-150	101-150	101-150	51-100	51-100	-
QS Subject Rankings: Chemical Engineering	101-150	151-200	151-200	-	151-200	-	-	-
QS Subject Rankings: Civil & Structural	101-150	101-150	101-150	101-150	101-150	101-150	101-150	-
QS Subject Rankings: Computer Science	51-100	51-100	51-100	51-100	51-100	51-100	51-100	-
The Times Higher Education World University Rankings	251-300		251-300	251-300	226-250	226-250	251-275	301-350
The Times Higher Education Subject Rankings: Engineering and Technology	151-175		126-150	91	100	96	-	-
The Times Higher Education Subject Rankings: Computer Science	76							
Academic Ranking of World Universities (Shanghai Ranking's)		301-400	401-500	401-500	401-500	401-500	401-500	401-500
Academic Ranking of World Universities, Subject field: Computer Sciences		76-100	-	-	101-150	76-100	76-100	101-150
Academic Ranking of World Universities, Subject field: Electrical Engineering			101-150	76-100	-	-	-	-
Academic Ranking of World Universities, Subject field: Materials Science			151-200	101-150	-	-	-	-
Academic Ranking of World Universities, Subject field: Mechanical Engineering			-	101-150	-	-	-	-

== Organization ==
TU Wien has eight faculties led by deans: Architecture and Planning, Chemistry, Civil Engineering, Computer Sciences, Electrical Engineering and Information Technology, Mathematics and Geoinformation, Mechanical and Industrial Engineering, and Physics.

The university is led by the Rector and four Vice Rectors (responsible for Research, Academic Affairs, Finance as well as Human Resources and Gender). The Senate has 26 members. The University Council, consisting of seven members, acts as a supervisory board.

== Research ==
Development work in almost all areas of technology is encouraged by the interaction between basic research and the different fields of engineering sciences at TU Wien. Also, the framework of cooperative projects with other universities, research institutes and business sector partners is established by the research section of TU Wien. TU Wien has sharpened its research profile by defining competence fields and setting up interdisciplinary collaboration centres, and clearer outlines will be developed.

Research focus points of TU Wien are introduced as computational science and engineering, quantum physics and quantum technologies, materials and matter, information and communication technology and energy and environment.

The EU Research Support (EURS) provides services at TU Wien and informs both researchers and administrative staff in preparing and carrying out EU research projects.

== Notable faculty and alumni ==
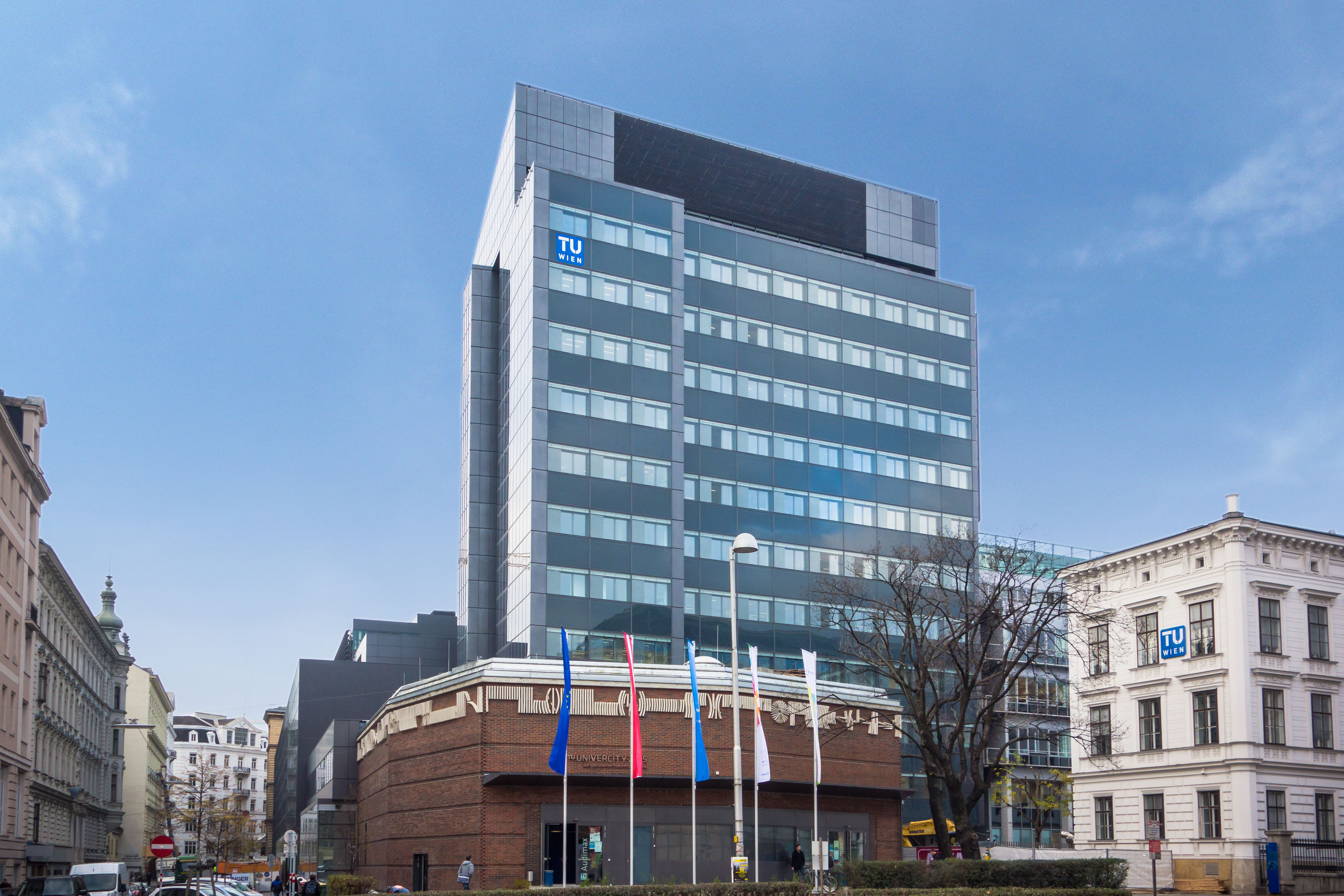
Plus Energy Office of TU Wien

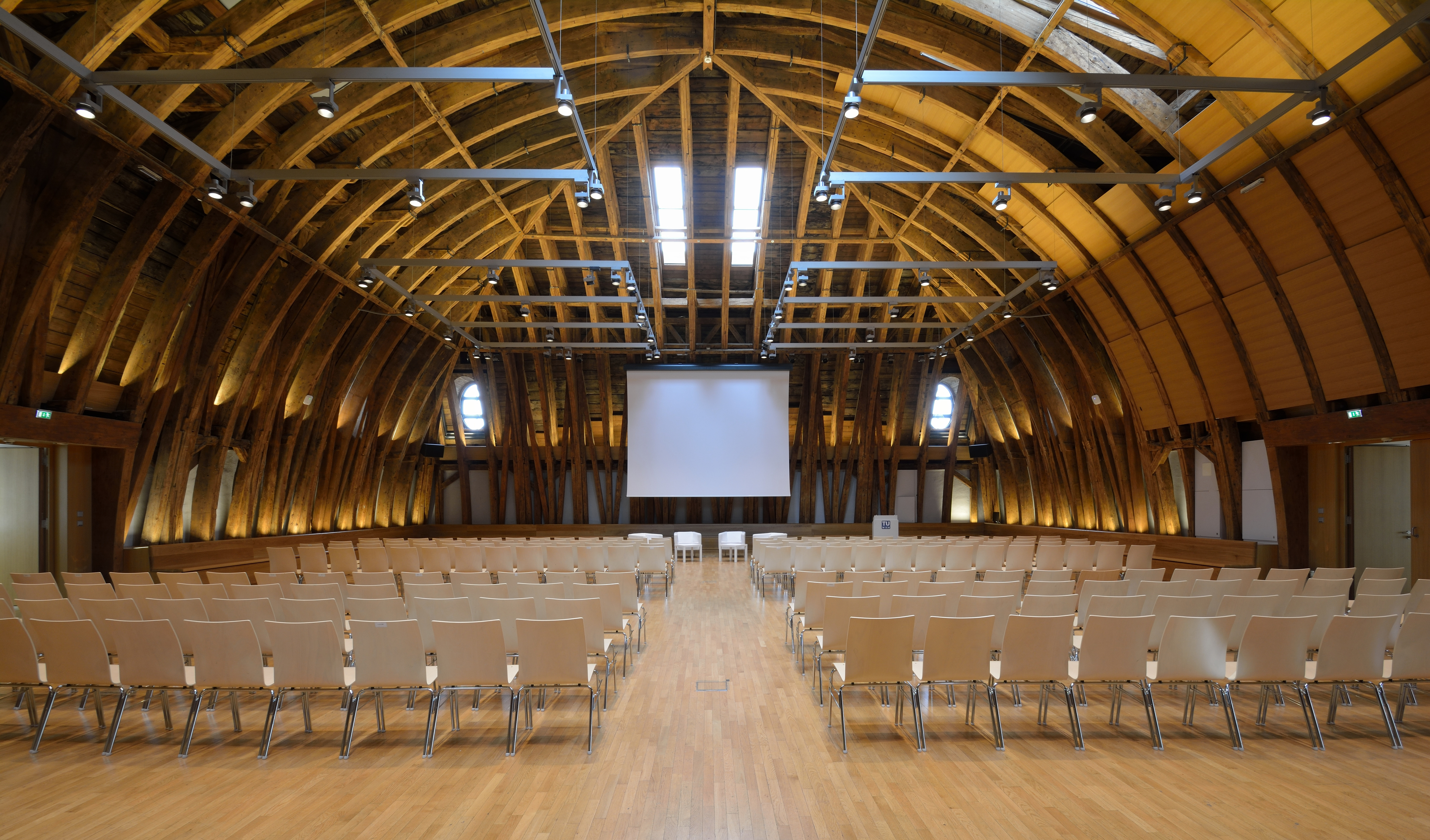
Kuppelsaal (cupola hall) of TU Wien

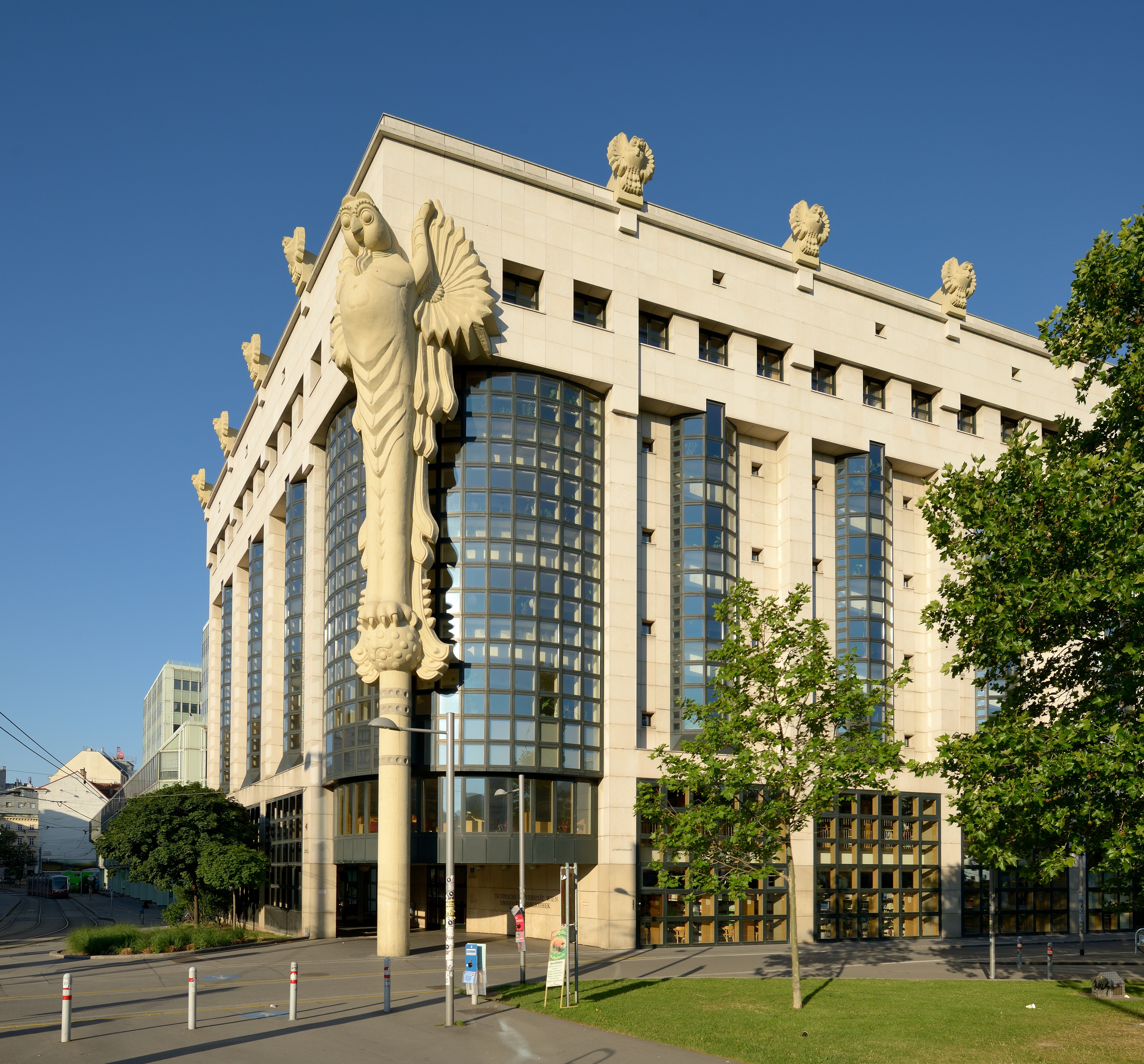
Library building of TU Wien

- Adolph Giesl-Gieslingen (1903–1992), Austrian locomotive designer and engineer
- Alexander Meissner (1883 – 1958), Austrian engineer and physicist, co-inventor of the Electronic oscillator
- Alfred Preis (1911–1993), designer of the USS Arizona Memorial in Pearl Harbor
- Benno Mengele (1898–1971), Austrian electrical engineer
- Camillo Sitte (1843-1903), Austrian architect
- Christian Andreas Doppler (1803–1853), Austrian mathematician and physicist
- Edmund Hlawka (1916-2009), Austrian mathematician
- Edo Šen (1877–1949), Croatian architect
- Elfriede Tungl (1922-1981), civil engineer, first Austrian woman to earn a doctorate in civil engineering, in 1973 became the first female associate professor at TU Wien.
- Ernst Hiesmayr (1920-2006), architect, artist and former rector of TU Wien
- Ferdinand Piëch (1937-2019), Austrian business magnate, engineer and executive who was the chairman of the supervisory board of Volkswagen Group
- Ferenc Krausz (born 1962), Hungarian–Austrian physicist, Nobel Prize in Physics 2023
- Franz Pitzinger (1858–1933), Constructor General of the Austrian Navy
- Gottfried Ungerboeck (1940), inventor of trellis modulation, IBM Fellow
- Günter Blöschl (born 1961), Austrian hydrologist
- Günther Tschabuschnig (born 1982), Austrian computer scientist
- Hannspeter Winter (1941-2006), Austrian plasma physicist
- Heinz Zemanek (1920-2014), Austrian computer pioneer
- Hellmuth Stachel (born 1942), Austrian mathematician
- Herman Potočnik (1892–1929), Slovene space pioneer
- Hermann Knoflacher (born 1940), Austrian engineer
- Hubert Petschnigg (1913–1997), architect (completed his studies at TU Graz)
- Hugo Ehrlich (1879–1936), Croatian architect
- Ignaz Sowinski (1858–1917), architect
- Ina Wagner (born 1946), Austrian physicist, sociologist, professor of computer science 1987 – 2011, TU's second ever female professor
- Ingeborg Hochmair (born 1953), electrical engineer, developed the first microelectronic, multi-channel cochlear implant
- Irfan Skiljan, author of the image viewer software Irfanview
- Jörg Streli (1940–2019), Austrian architect
- Karl Gölsdorf (1861–1916), Austrian engineer and locomotive designer
- Leon Kellner (1859–1928), grammarian, Shakespearean, and Zionist
- Marie-Therese Hohenberg (born 1972), Austrian architect
- Milan Vidmar (1885-1962), Slovene electrical engineer
- Milutin Milanković (1879–1958), Serbian geophysicist and civil engineer
- Ottó Titusz Bláthy (1860–1939), Hungarian mechanical engineer
- Paul Eisler (1907–1992), inventor of the printed circuit
- Paul Schneider-Esleben (1915–2005), visiting professor of architecture
- Peter Schattschneider (born 1950), Austrian physicist
- Peter Skalicky (born 1941), rector of TU Wien from 1991 to 2011
- Richard von Mises (1883–1953), scientist
- Rudolf Steiner (1861-1925), Austrian philosopher and transdisciplinary researcher
- Rudolph Michael Schindler (1887–1953), early Modern architect
- Siegfried Becher (1806–1873), professor of economics
- Silke Bühler-Paschen, professor of physics
- Tillman Gerngross, Professor of Engineering at Dartmouth College, leading entrepreneur and bioengineer, founder of GlycoFi and Adimab
- Ulrike Diebold (born 1961), Austrian–American physicist, vice president of the Austrian Academy of Sciences
- Victoria Coeln (born 1962), Austrian light artist
- Viktor Kaplan (1876–1934), inventor of the Kaplan turbine
- Vinzenz Bronzin (1872-1970), Italian mathematics professor, and pioneering finance theorist
- Yordan Milanov (1867–1932), one of the leading Bulgarian architects from the end of 19th and the beginning of the 20th century
- Zvonimir Richtmann (1901–1941), Croatian physicist, philosopher, politician and publicist

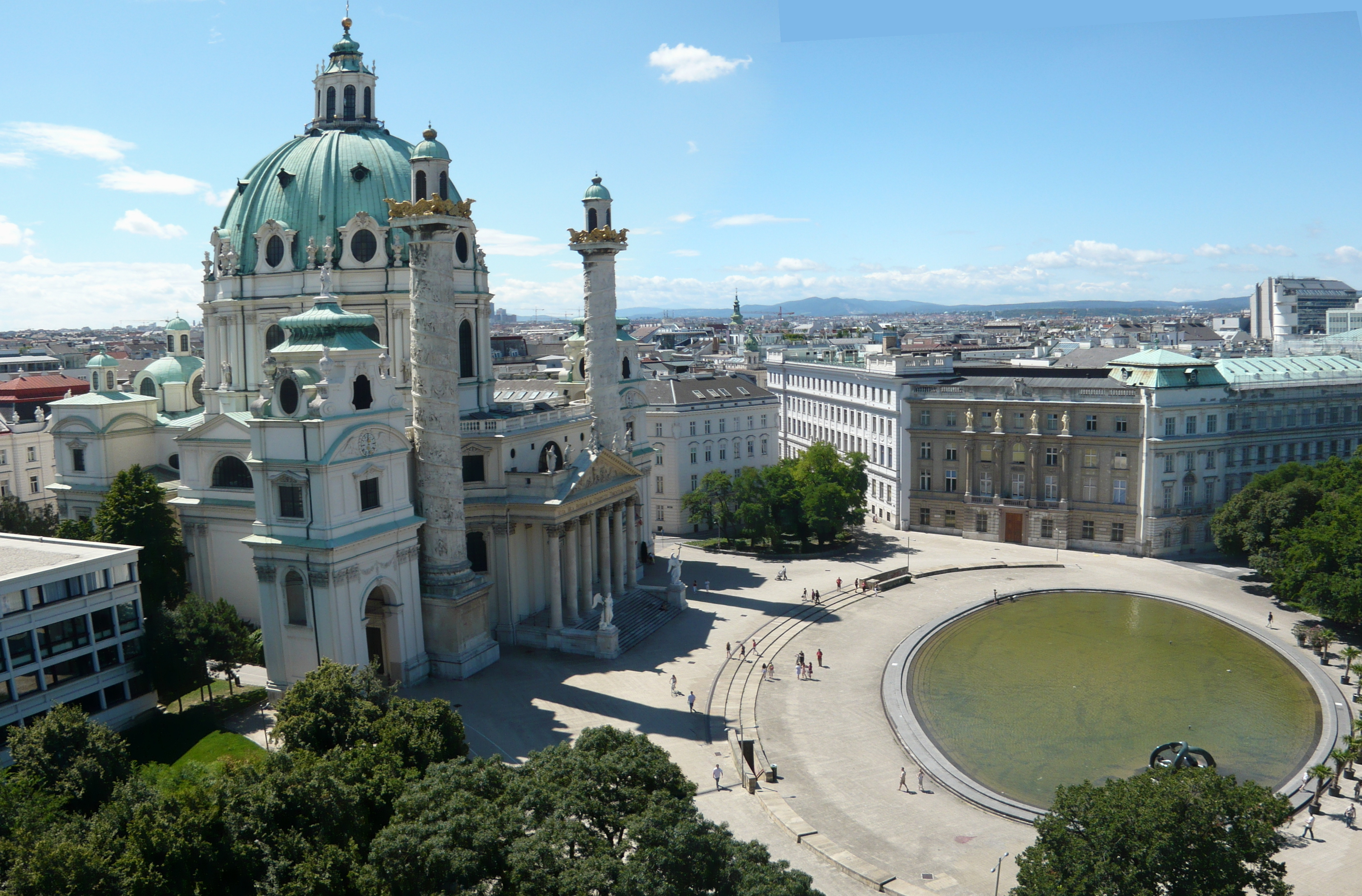
Karlskirche and the TU Wien

== Library ==
TU Wien Bibliothek, the university library, was founded in 1815. The main library building was designed by the architects Justus Dahinden, Reinhard Gieselmann, Alexander Marchart, Roland Moebius, and partners. Completed in 1987, it features owl sculptures by the Swiss artist Bruno Weber. The main library has six floors of open access areas and reading rooms, with around 700 study desks.

== Sports ==
The university hosted the IFIUS World Interuniversity Games in October 2007.

== See also ==
- TU Austria
