= University of Leoben =

Austrian university of technology

Technical University of Leoben
- Montanuniversität Leoben
- Type: Public university Institute of technology
- Established: 1840; 186 years ago
- Rector: Peter Moser
- Academic staff: 909
- Students: 4,030
- Location: Leoben, Styria, Austria; 47°23′08″N 15°05′35″E
- Website: unileoben.ac.at

The Technical University of Leoben is a public university in Leoben, Styria, Austria. It was established on 4 November 1840 as the Steiermärkisch-Ständische Montanlehranstalt in Vordernberg, Styria, Austria's mining region. In 1849, Peter Tunner relocated the university to nearby Leoben.

The Technical University of Leoben is a member of TU Austria, an association of three Austrian universities of technology and offers education and conducts research in the fields of mining, metallurgy and materials science.

== Name ==
The university calls itself the Technical University of Leoben in English, the Austrian Federal Ministry of Women, Science and Research calls the university the Leoben University Mining and Metallurgy [sic] in English and an English translation of the 2002 Universities Act calls it the University of Mining Leoben.

== Departments ==
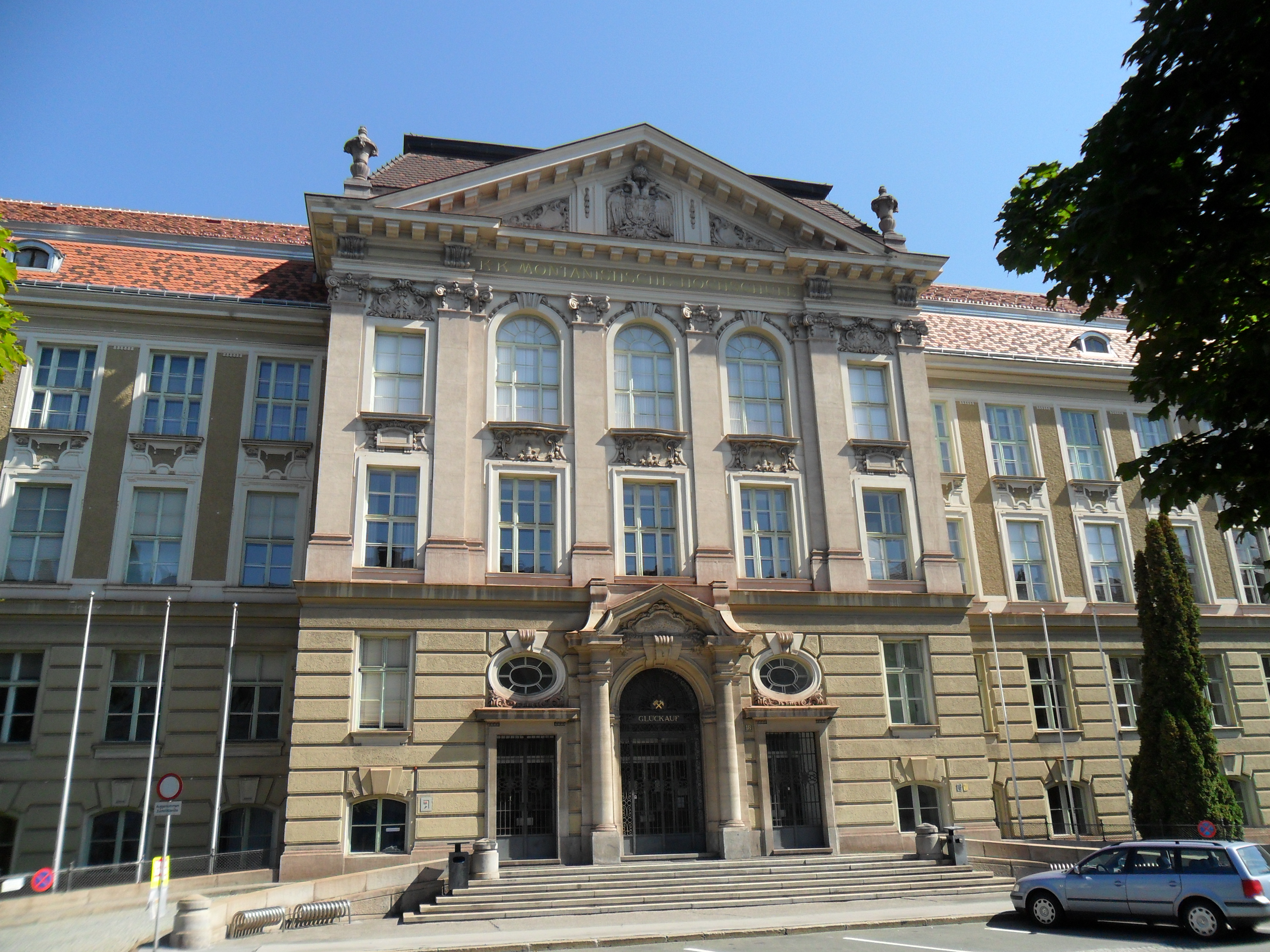
Technical University of Leoben

Currently, the university has the following departments:

- Department of Analytical and Physical Chemistry
- Department of Polymer Engineering and Science
- Institute of Electrical Engineering
- Department of Geoscience and Geophysics
- Department of Materials Science
- Department of Mathematics and Information Technology
- Institute of Mechanical Engineering
- Department of Metallurgy
- Department Mineral Resources and Petroleum Engineering
- Department of Product Engineering
- Department of Economics
- Institute for Process Technology and Industrial Environmental Protection

== Rankings ==
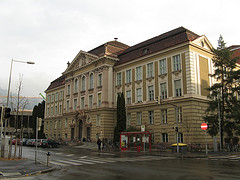
The university's main building

In Shanghai Ranking Consultancy's 2025 global ranking of academic subjects, the university attained rank five in metallurgical engineering among European universities and ranked 42 worldwide. It was in the 201-300 range in materials science & engineering.

In 2024 it ranked in the range 801-1000 in Times Higher Education (THE) World University Ranking and in engineering sciences, 601-800.

== Notable alumni ==
- Peter J. Uggowitzer, Austrian-Swiss metallurgist who is a precursor of nickel-free austenitic stainless steels, aluminium crossover alloys and biodegradable magnesium alloys for implants.

== Faculty and staff ==
- Hellmut Fischmeister, professor of metallurgy and materials testing 1975-1981
- Wilfried Imrich, professor of mathematics

== See also ==
- TU Austria
