= Ettingshausen (disambiguation) =

Ettingshausen is an inhabited place in Reiskirchen, Giessen, Hesse, Germany.

Ettingshausen may also refer to:

- Albert von Ettingshausen (1850–1932), Austrian physicist
  - Ettingshausen effect
  - Nernst-Ettingshausen effect
- Andreas von Ettingshausen (1796–1878), German mathematician and physicist
- Andrew Ettingshausen (born 1965), Australian rugby league player
- Colin von Ettingshausen (born 1971), German rower who competed at the 1992 Summer Olympics
- Baron Constantin von Ettingshausen (1826–1897), Austrian botanist

== See also ==
- Ettinghausen (disambiguation)
- Von Ettingshausen, a surname
