= Ingrid Mertig =

German materials scientist

- Education: TU Dresden
- Scientific career
- Workplaces: TU Dresden; Max Planck Institute of Microstructure Physics
- Thesis: Einfluss von substitutionellen Punktdefekten auf die galvanomagnetischen Eigenschaften von Metallen (1982)

Ingrid Mertig is a German materials scientist who is a professor and fellow at the Max Planck Institute of Microstructure Physics. She was awarded the Institute of Physics Max Born Medal and Prize.

== Early life and education ==
Mertig studied physics at TU Dresden. She remained there for her doctoral research, where she studied the influence of point defects on the galvanomagnetic properties (phenomena that occur when a current is passed through a conductor in a magnetic field) of metals. She completed her doctorate in 1982 and was appointed an assistant professor. She worked as a postdoctoral researcher at the Joint Institute for Nuclear Research in Dubna, Soviet Union.

== Research and career ==
Mertig was made a Fellow at the Max Planck Institute of Microstructure Physics in 2007. Her research group study solid state theory. Specifically, she develops material specific descriptions of nanostructured systems. Mertig develops these descriptions using green functions, which can be used to describe thin films, surfaces or heterostructures. The computational effort required to perform these calculations scales with the numbers of atoms, making it possible to evaluate systems of a realistic size. She starts from the atomic structure of a system.

Mertig is an expert in spintronics, which make use of an electron's charge and spin degree of freedom, could transform future sensors and information technologies. Mertig performs first-principles electronic structure calculations using density functional theory. She has used simulations to understand spin-dependent transport processes in magnetic, metallic and molecular devices. Her calculations can explain spintronic phenomena, including giant magnetoresistance, the spin Nernst Effect and the spin Hall effect.

Mertig advised the German Science and Humanities Council as an expert in 2017–2018. In 2024, she was awarded the Institute of Physics Max Born Medal and Prize.

== Selected publications ==
- M Lorenz; M S Ramachandra Rao; T Venkatesan; et al. (7 October 2016). "The 2016 oxide electronic materials and oxide interfaces roadmap". Journal of Physics D. 49 (43) 433001. doi:10.1088/0022-3727/49/43/433001. hdl:10261/146996. ISSN 0022-3727.
- Igor Solovyev; Dederichs PH; Mertig I I (1 November 1995). "Origin of orbital magnetization and magnetocrystalline anisotropy in TX ordered alloys (where T=Fe,Co and X=Pd,Pt)". Physical Review B. 52 (18): 13419–13428. doi:10.1103/PHYSREVB.52.13419. ISSN 0163-1829. PMID 9980535.
- Volodymyr V Maslyuk; Alexei Bagrets; Velimir Meded; Andreas Arnold; Ferdinand Evers; Mads Brandbyge; Thomas Bredow; Ingrid Mertig (30 August 2006). "Organometallic benzene-vanadium wire: A one-dimensional half-metallic ferromagnet". Physical Review Letters. 97 (9) 097201. arXiv:cond-mat/0510144. doi:10.1103/PHYSREVLETT.97.097201. ISSN 0031-9007. PMID 17026394.
