= Ferdinand Wittenbauer =

Austrian mechanical engineer and writer (1857-1922)

- Born: 18 February 1857; Maribor, Austrian Empire
- Died: 16 February 1922 (aged 64); Graz, Austria
- Occupations: Mechanical engineer, writer

Ferdinand Wittenbauer (18 February 1857 in Maribor – 16 February 1922 in Graz) was an Austrian mechanical engineer and writer. He is known for introducing graphic methods in dynamics.

== Biography ==
Ferdinand Wittenbauer was born on 18 February 1857 in Maribor as third child to Ferdinand Wittenbauer, a military doctor. His parents died early. He then lived in Graz with his uncle and attended Realschule, where he was always top of his class. He did his Matura at the early age of fifteen and later studied at the School of Engineering at Technische Hochschule Graz. He completed his military service 1876/77 in Vienna and became a lieutenant of the reserve in 1878. In 1879, he graduated from the Technische Hochschule with honours. In 1880 he habilitated in theoretical mechanics. From 1883 to 1884 he undertook a study trip through Germany visiting the universities of Berlin and Freiburg im Breisgau. In 1887, he was appointed to the chair Reine und Technische Mechanik und Theoretische Maschinenlehre which relates to mechanics and machine science at the Technische Hochschule Graz. He succeeded Franz Stark who was appointed professor at the Deutsche Technische Hochschule in Prague. From 1894 to 1896 and from 1903 to 1905, Wittenbauer served as dean to the faculty of mechanical engineering, from 1911 to 1912 as rector to his alma mater.

Ferdinand Wittenbauer married Hermine née Weiß in 1882. His wife died in 1914. Their only son Ferdinand was born in 1886, became an engineer as well and died by suicide in September 1922. Ferdinand Wittenbauer died on 16 February 1922 in Graz due to the consequences of a stroke he suffered earlier that year.

== Scientific work ==
At the beginning of his scientific career, Wittenbauer worked on kinematic geometry. His main contribution lay in applying graphic methods of kinematic geometry to dynamics. In 1904, he started publishing treatises which were preliminary works for his almost 800-page book on Graphische Dynamik (Graphical Dynamics), which he completed only shortly before his death. In 1905, Wittenbauer first published his internationally acclaimed and still valid method for a graphic determination of the flywheel moment of inertia.

Ferdinand Wittenbauer also discovered an easy method to calculate the centroid (centre of mass) of any quadrangle, known as Wittenbauer Theorem or Wittenbauer's Parallelogram.

In addition, Wittenbauer is known for his Aufgaben aus der technischen Mechanik, a collection of exercises in technical mechanics including solutions published in three volumes. Co-author was mathematician and engineer Theodor Pöschl (son to Jakob Pöschl Nikola Tesla’s teacher). Finished in 1911, it served as very first and then most prominent set of problems in the fields of mechanics in the German-speaking area for some decades. It was translated into several languages, in 1965 a Spanish edition still appeared.

== Literary work ==
Regarding his literary work, three plays Filia hospitalis (1903), Der Privatdozent (1905) and Der weite Blick (1908) were performed in theatres of the German-speaking area on a regular basis in the beginning of the 20th century. The plays reflect political, cultural and social aspects of studying and working at the university at the time.

== Honours ==
- Honorary doctorate of Deutsche Technische Hochschule in Prague (1917)
