= Anna Köhler =

Anna Köhler may refer to:

- Anna Kohler, German-American theater actress, director and translator
- Anna Köhler (bobsledder) (born 1993), German bobsledder
- Anna Köhler (scientist), German physicist
