= Max Born Medal and Prize =

Institute of Physics (IOP) and German Physical Society (DPG) award

- Awarded for: Outstanding contributions to Physics
- Sponsored by: German Physical Society, Institute of Physics
- Presented by: German Physical Society, Institute of Physics
- Rewards: Silver medal, €3000
- First award: 1973
- Website: www.iop.org/about/awards/international-bilateral-awards

The Max Born Medal and Prize is a scientific prize awarded yearly by the German Physical Society (DPG) and the British Institute of Physics (IOP) in memory of the German physicist Max Born, who was a German-Jewish physicist, instrumental in the development of quantum mechanics. It was established in 1972 and first awarded in 1973.

The terms of the award are that it is "to be presented for outstanding contributions to physics". The award goes to physicists based in Germany and in the UK or Ireland in alternate years. The prize is accompanied by a silver medal "about 6 cm in diameter and 0.5 cm thick. One face carries a profile of Max Born and his name and dates. The other face carries the equation pq – qp = h/2πi and the full names of IOP and DPG. The recipient's full name and year of award is engraved around the rim." The medal is accompanied by €3000.

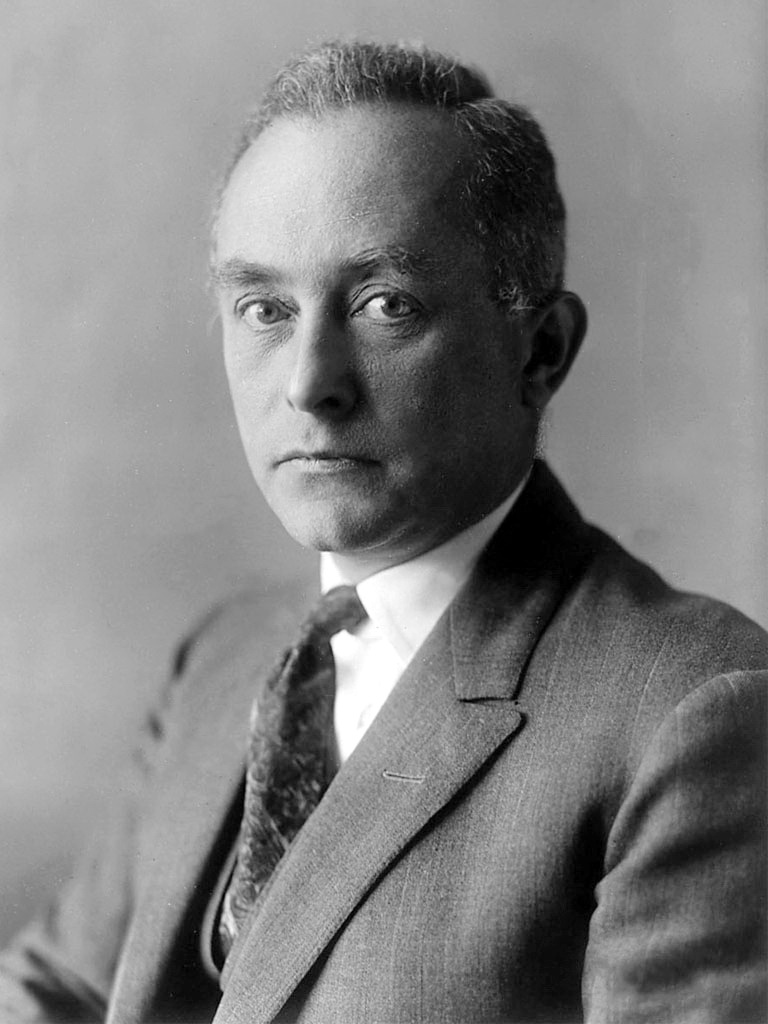
Max Born circa 1930–1940

== List of recipients ==
The following have received this award:

- 1973 Roger Cowley
- 1974 Walter Greiner
- 1975 Trevor Moss
- 1976 Hermann Haken
- 1977 Walter Spear
- 1978 Herbert Walther
- 1979 John Taylor
- 1980 Helmut Faissner
- 1981 Cyril Domb
- 1982 Wolfgang Kaiser
- 1983 Andrew Keller
- 1984 Amand Faessler
- 1985 George Isaak
- 1986 Josef Stuke
- 1987 Cyril Hilsum
- 1988 Peter Armbruster
- 1989 Robert H. Williams
- 1990 Ernst O. Göbel
- 1991 Gilbert Lonzarich
- 1992 Joachim Heintze
- 1993 David C. Hanna
- 1994 Wolfgang Demtröder
- 1995 Michael H Key
- 1996 Jürgen Mlynek
- 1997 Robin Marshall
- 1998 Gerhard Abstreiter
- 1999 John Dainton
- 2000 Rolf Felst
- 2001 Volker Heine
- 2002 Siegfried Dietrich
- 2003 Brian Foster
- 2004 Matthias Scheffler
- 2005 Michael William Finnis
- 2006 Dieter Bimberg
- 2007 Alan D. Martin
- 2008 Hagen Kleinert
- 2009 Robin Devenish
- 2010 Simon White
- 2011 David Philip Woodruff
- 2012 Martin Bodo Plenio
- 2013 Max Klein
- 2014 Alexander I. Lichtenstein
- 2015 Andrea Cavalleri
- 2016 Christian Pfleiderer
- 2017 Carlos Silvestre Frenk
- 2018 Ángel Rubio
- 2019 Michael Coey
- 2020 Anna Köhler
- 2021 Hiranya Peiris
- 2022 Claudia Felser
- 2023 Stefan Söldner-Rembold
- 2024 Ingrid Mertig
- 2025 Michael Johnston
- 2026 Roderich Moessner

== See also ==
- Institute of Physics Awards
- List of physics awards
- List of awards named after people
