= Spin Hall magnetoresistance =

Spin Hall magnetoresistance (SMR) is a transport phenomenon that is found in some electrical conductors that have at least one surface in direct contact with another magnetic material due to changes in the spin current that are present in metals and semiconductors with a large spin Hall angle. It is most easily detected when the magnetic material is an insulator which eliminates other magnetically sensitive transport effects arising from conduction in the magnetic material.

== Origins ==
Spin Hall magnetoresistance is one of many ways in which the electrical resistance of a material is influenced by the spin Hall effect. An electron moving through a conductor is scattered by the spin Hall effect in a direction determined by its spin orientation which induces a net accumulation of spin at the conductor's edge. The spin-polarized electrons at the conductor's surface can interact with the magnetization of a magnetic material near through a spin-transfer torque. When the conduction electron spin is aligned parallel to the magnetization direction the electron reflects from the conductor surface with no change in its spin, however, when there is a component of the magnetization that is normal to the spin orientation, the spin can be flipped to its opposite state transferring angular momentum into the magnetic material. This results in a spin current that travels at a normal to the direction of the charge current that can be altered by changing the direction of magnetization. This spin current is deflected through the inverse spin Hall effect which adds or subtracts from the electrons momentum in the direction of the charge current depending on the size and sign of the conductor spin Hall angle. This deflection provides an addition to the conductor's resistivity allowing the spin current to be estimated by the change in the electrical resistivity.

== Description ==
A multilayer of conductor and magnetic material is needed to construct a device that exhibits the spin Hall magnetoresistance. Platinum is commonly used as a conductor due to its large spin Hall angle and YIG is used as a magnetic material with the conductor being deposited on top with a clean interface. The magnetization of the YIG can be rotated by an applied magnetic field strong enough to saturate it which results in a change in the conductor's resistivity. The scale of the resistance change observed depends on the conductor's spin Hall angle and the ratio of the spin diffusion length and the thickness of the conducting material. As most spin diffusion lengths are short, the effect is only significant in materials that are only several nanometers thick.

=== Angular dependency ===
One of the signatures of the spin Hall magnetoresistance is that the change in resistance is observed when the magnetization of the insulator is rotated with respect to the spin axis and not to the direction of the charge current as is seen in anisotropic magnetoresistance. The change in resistivity follows a squared sine wave pattern when the magnetization vector is rotated about an axis that has a component normal to the spin axis. Platinum has been observed to have maximum resistivity changes of up to 0.12%.

=== Temperature dependence ===
In platinum, the maximum resistance change is found to reach a maximum at approximately 120K for all thicknesses

== Applications ==
Due to the spin-transfer torque at the interface of the conductor and magnet, a spin current can be injected from the metal into the insulator. This allows for new spintronics experiments to investigate the possibility of transmitting spin information through an insulator which would have the advantage of no power loss due to Joule heating.
