= Pöschl =

Pöschl is a surname. Notable people with the surname include:

- Albert Pöschl (21st century), German bass player for the band Queen of Japan
- Franz Pöschl (1917–2011), officer in the Wehrmacht of Nazi Germany during World War II and a general in the Bundeswehr of West Germany
- Hanno Pöschl (born 1949), Austrian actor
- Jakob Pöschl (1828–1907), Austrian physicist and university teacher
- Ulrich Pöschl (born 1969), director of the multiphase chemistry department at the Max-Planck-Institute for Chemistry in Mainz, Germany
