= Katharina Dobler =

Austrian folklorist (1918–2003)

Katharina "Kathi" Dobler (9 November 1918 – 9 May 2003) was an Austrian folklorist and folk culture activist.

== Early life and education ==
After attending elementary school in Zell an der Pram and secondary school in Grieskirchen, Dobler completed a commercial apprenticeship and worked as a saleswoman.

From 1941 to 1945, she attended the workers' school in Linz, where she graduated from high school. Dobler then studied folklore, German, and philosophy at the University of Graz and received her doctorate in 1950. Dobler wrote her dissertation on the dialect poetry of Anton Schosser.

== Career ==
She then joined the state service as an office worker. Then Dobler worked there on the central catalogue. In 1956, she entered the federal service and worked at the federal department for adult education (later the federal promotion agency for adult education for Upper Austria), where she became deputy director.

Dobler campaigned intensively to preserve her municipality's homeland, dialect, and monuments. She founded and headed the homeland care working group, and initiated the founding of the state associations.

In 1969 Dobler founded educational centers for creative leisure activities. Through her commitment, a planned demolition of Zell an der Pram Castle was prevented. The castle was renovated and opened in 1979 as a state education center. From 1985 to 1991, Dobler was chairman of the Stelzhamerbund.

== Awards ==
- 1975 - Ring of honor of the municipality of Zell an der Pram
- 1979 - Gold Medal of Honor for services to the Republic of Austria
- 1980 - Order of Merit of the Federal Republic of Germany
- 1984 - Honorary citizen of the municipality of Zell an der Pram
- 1985 - Professional title of Hofrat
- 1996 - Ring of honor of the Augustinian Canons of Reichersberg
- 1998 - Medal of Merit of the Bavarian-Swabia government district
