= Andrew Keller =

British physicist

Andrew Keller, FRS
- Born: Andras Keller; 22 August 1925; Budapest, Hungary
- Died: 7 February 1999 (aged 73); Switzerland
- Citizenship: Naturalized British
- Education: University of Budapest; University of Bristol
- Known for: Crystallization of polymers
- Spouse: Eva Bulhack
- Children: Peter and Nicola
- Awards: See list
- Scientific career
- Fields: Polymer physics
- Workplaces: Imperial Chemical Industries (ICI); University of Bristol

Andras (Andrew) Keller FRS (22 August 1925 – 7 February 1999) was a naturalized British polymer scientist. He was Research Professor in Polymer Science, Department of Physics, University of Bristol, 1969–91, then professor emeritus.

== Biography ==
Andras Keller was born in Budapest, the only child of Jewish parents. He entered the University of Budapest in 1943, and gained his BSc in chemistry cum laude in 1947. He began his PhD studies at the same university but his work was interrupted by the rapidly deteriorating political situation in Hungary in 1948. He fled to England, leaving behind a submitted but unexamined PhD thesis.

He took a position with Imperial Chemical Industries in Manchester, as technical officer in the Polymers Division, where he was given the task of working out how the physical structure of polymers affects crystallization. In 1955, he moved to the University of Bristol Physics Department as Research Assistant, under Charles Frank, heading a team financed by the Ministry of Supply (later Ministry of Aviation). Here, he began to further develop his ideas on crystallisation, and obtained his PhD in 1958. Meanwhile, Keller had become a naturalized citizen of the UK in 1954 or 1955.

A key part of his work at Bristol was his discovery in 1957 of chain folding in polymer crystals. The findings were not universally accepted however, and there was much debate between opposing camps for many years to come. It came to a head at a Faraday Discussion in Cambridge in 1979. It was an important meeting because “The arguments thereafter moved from whether one believed in regular chain folding, or in no chain folding at all, to issues of the degree of regularity of the folding under the specific conditions of solidification of a particular material.”

Keller retired in 1991. The occasion was marked by a conference that year on polymer physics at Bristol.

=== Family ===
Keller met Eva Bulhack, a Transylvanian Saxon from Romania, in England. They married in 1951, and had two children: Peter and Nicola.

Andrew Keller died of a heart attack on 7 February 1999 while on a skiing holiday in Switzerland.

== Honours and awards ==
- 1964 High Polymer Physics Prize, American Physical Society
- 1969 Prize of Materials Science Club of Great Britain
- 1972 Fellow of The Royal Society
- 1975 Swinburne Medal of the Plastics and Rubber Institute, London
- 1980 Centennial Scholar and Medal, Case Institute of Technology, Cleveland, Ohio
- 1981 Clyde Medal of the University of Utah
- 1983 Max Born Medal and Prize
- 1983 Fraser Price Memorial Award, University of Massachusetts
- 1984 Rumford Medal of The Royal Society
- 1984 Medal of the Collège de France, Paris
- 1994 Elected member of the Academia Europaea
- 1998 Elected External Member of the Hungarian Academy of Sciences
