= Wolfgang Demtröder =

German physicist

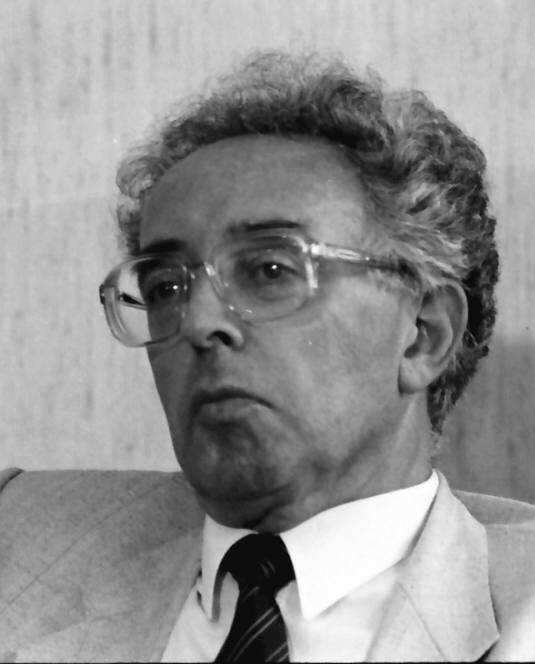
Image of Wolfgang Demtröder

Wolfgang Demtröder (b. 5 September 1931 in Attendorn) is a German physicist and spectroscopist. He is the author of several textbooks on laser spectroscopy and a series of four textbooks on experimental physics. His books entitled Laserspektroskopie and Laser Spectroscopy are considered classics in the field. From 1970 til 1999, he was ordinary professor at Kaiserslautern University of Technology. Awarded the Max Born Prize in 1994.
