= Leonid Andrussow =

German chemical engineer (1896–1988)

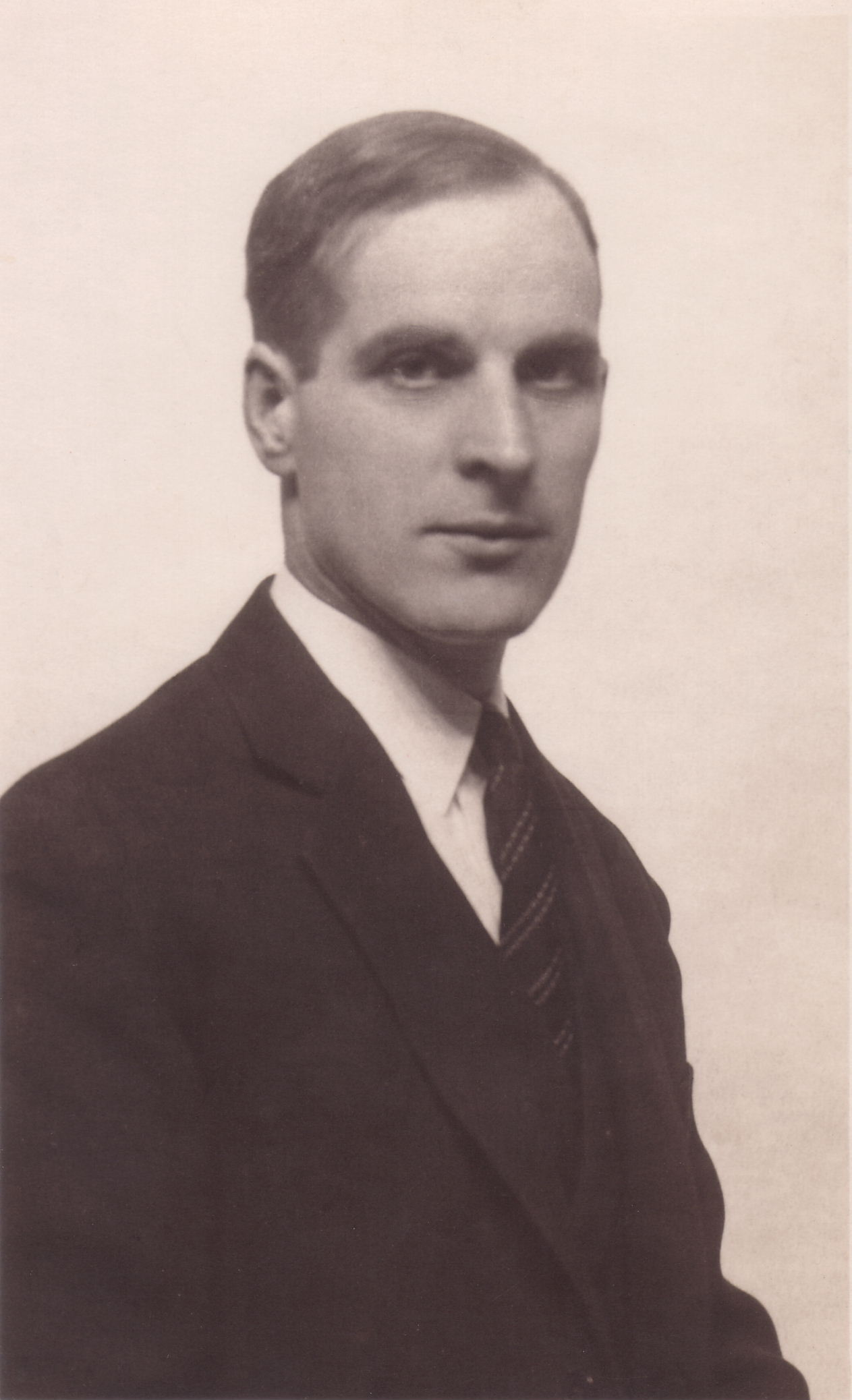
- Leonid Andrussow in 1933
- Born: 28 November 1896; Riga, Governorate of Livonia, Russian Empire
- Died: 15 December 1988 (aged 92); Paris, France
- Known for: Andrussow oxidation
- Scientific career
- Fields: Chemistry

Signature
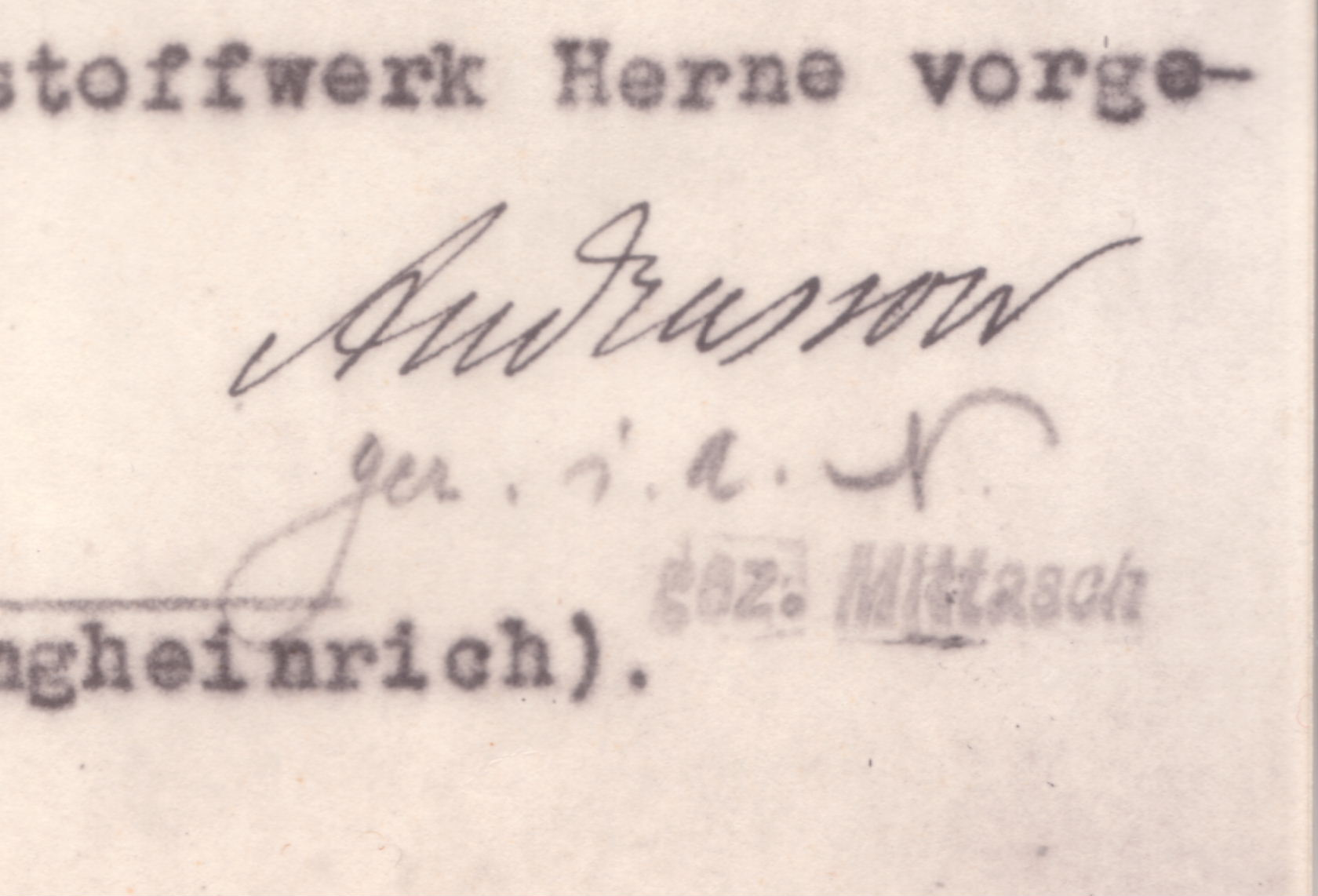

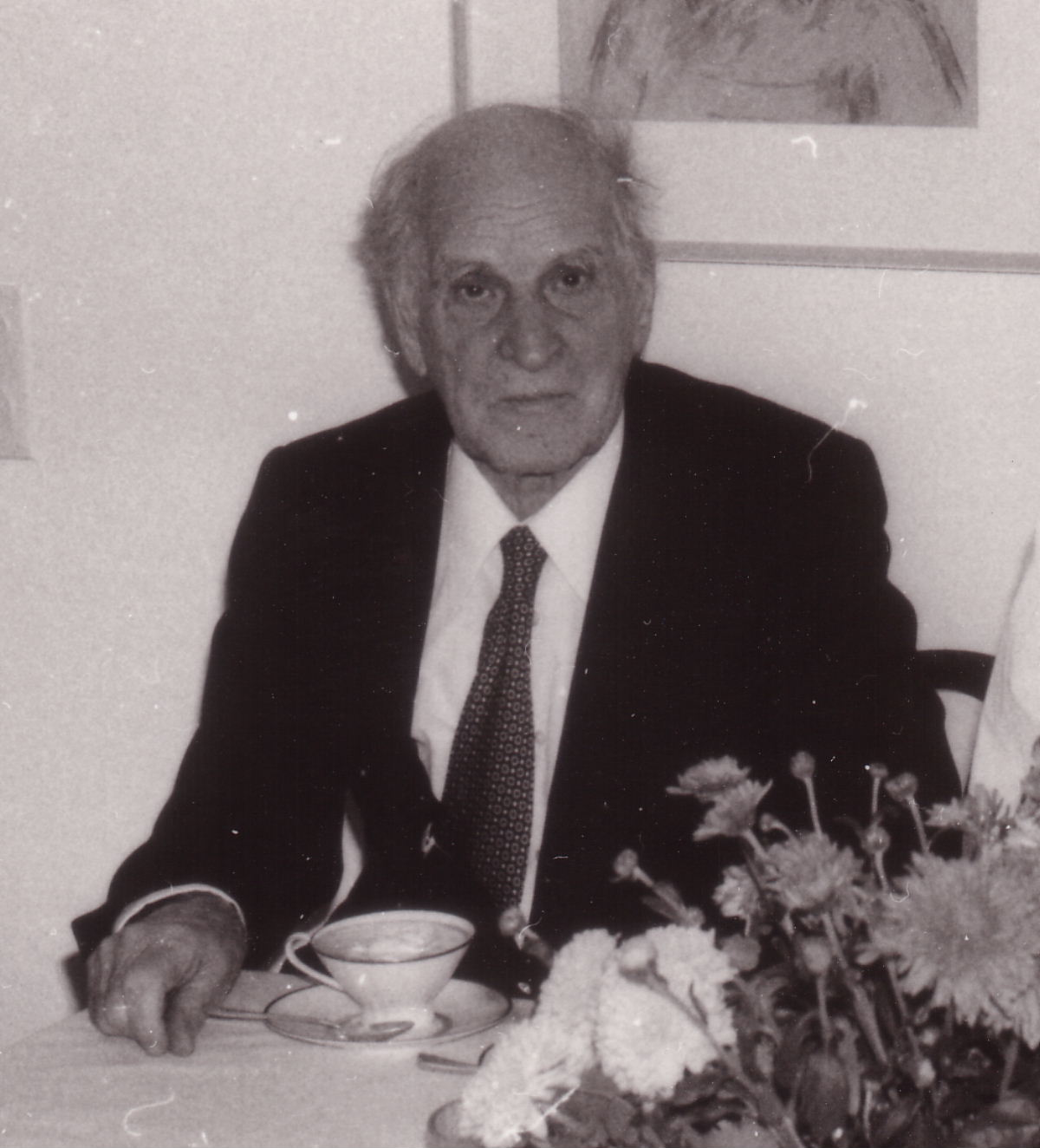
Leonid Andrussow in 1977

Leonid Andrussow (28 November 1896 – 15 December 1988) was a German chemical engineer. He developed the process for the production of hydrogen cyanide based on the oxidation of ammonia and methane, which is named after him Andrussow oxidation.

== Biography ==
Leonid Andrussow was born in Riga, Governorate of Livonia, Russian Empire (now Latvia). His father Woldemar Georg, who earned his law degree at the University of St. Petersburg, was general counsel for the Russian Railroads in Riga. He was of Swedish and Baltic German ancestry, the original family name being Andersohn. Andrussow was graduated in chemical engineering from the University of Riga. During the Russian Revolution, he served as a White cavalry officer, and in 1920 was captured by the Bolsheviks in Turkestan. He was imprisoned on an island near Baku, and then transferred to the infamous Cheka prison, Lubianka in Moscow. He was released after three months when it became apparent that he had contracted malaria. He moved to Berlin, where he attended the Friedrich Wilhelms University, earning his doctorate in chemistry in 1926 under Walther Nernst. His thesis title was "Über die katalytische Ammoniakoxydation." In 1926, he married Irmgard Von Bredow, with whom he had six children. In 1927, he began researching rocket fuels, working at BASF, then IG Farben, in Ludwigshafen. According to Leon Green, Jr., of the Air Force Systems Command, Andrussow was probably the first person, in 1937, to conceive of the idea of a rocket propellant consisting of both liquid and solid components. See External link (p. I.6). He continued his work in catalytical processes, registering many patents for I.G. Farben, including that which became known as the "Andrussow Process." From 1946 on, he lived in Grenoble, and later in Paris. He became a member of the French Academy of Sciences, and in 1969, edited Bd. II, Eigenschaften der Materie in ihren Aggregatzuständen. Teil 5a, Transportphänomene I (Viskosität und Diffusion) of the Landolt-Börnstein Zahlenwerte und Funktionen. He died in Paris at the age of 92.

== Work ==
- Based on the theory of fast running catalytical processes, which was developed in 1927, the oxidative synthesis of hydrogen cyanide from ammonia and methane was found in 1930 and developed to an industrial stage. This process, which is known as the “Andrussow Process”, is the most important method for the industrial production of hydrogen cyanide as a preliminary product for the synthesis of polyamide 66 (nylon) and for acrylic glass (polymethyl methacrylate).
- 1932 Work on the catalytical alkylation with ether for the industrial production of purest dimethylaniline.
- Conversion of tetrachlorethane to methylene chloride and trichlorethylene.
- Numerous works on rocket fuels, among others the introduction of the system nitric acid and amines or other fuels. Collaboration during the development of the V-2 rocket in Stromberg. Addition of laughing gas for the substantial increase of flying velocity at high altitudes.
- Advisory function in France coupled to the further development of the theory of catalytical processes: Sulphuric acid anhydride, formaldehyde, synthesis of ammonia.
- Numerous studies on the transport properties of gases and liquids, inclusive macromolecules.
- Author of Transportphänomene I (Viskosität und Diffusion), Bd. II, Teil 5a (1969) of Landolt-Börnstein Zahlenwerte und Funktionen aus Physik, Chemie, Astronomie, Geophysik und Technik. 6. Aufl.

In 1927 he demonstrated that methane and ammonia react in the presence of oxygen at about 1200 °C over a platinum catalyst:
$$\ce{CH4 + NH3 + 1.5O2 -> HCN + 3H2O}$$
The energy needed for the reaction is provided by the part oxidation of methane and ammonia.

== Patents ==
- US patent 1934838, Leonid Andrussow, "Production of hydrocyanic acid", published 1933-11-14, assigned to I.G. Farbenindustrie AG (pdf)
