= Walther Nernst =

German physical chemist (1864–1941)

Walther Nernst FRS
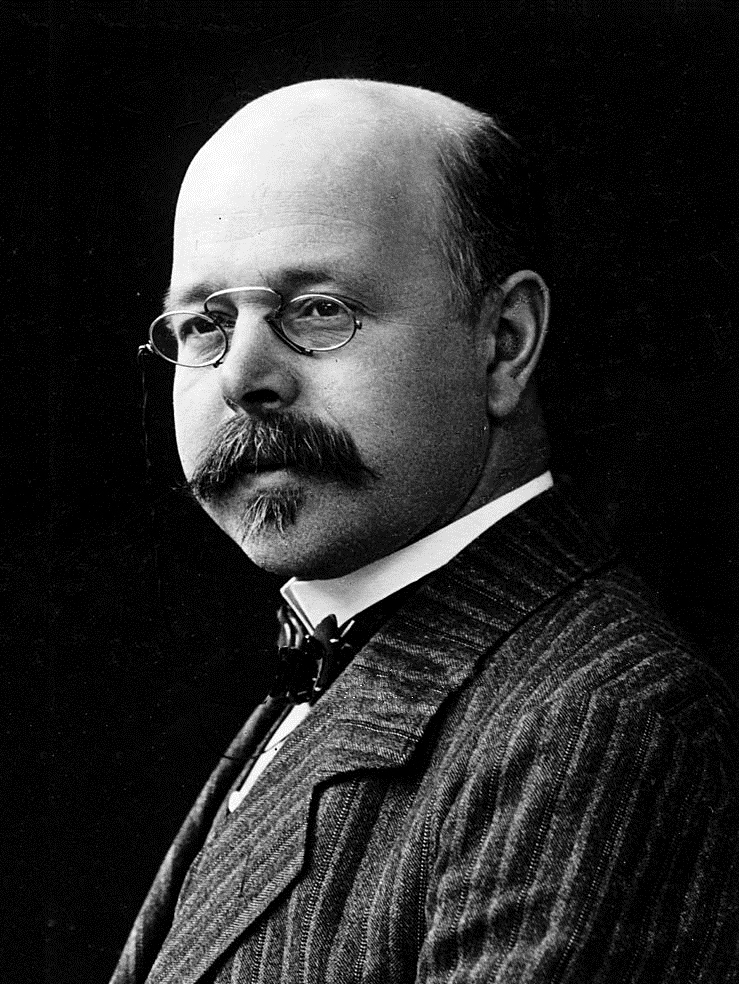
- Born: 25 June 1864; Briesen, Prussia (now Wąbrzeźno, Poland)
- Died: 18 November 1941 (aged 77); Zibelle, Gau Lower Silesia, Nazi Germany (now Niwica, Poland)
- Education: University of Zurich; Friedrich Wilhelm University of Berlin; University of Graz; University of Würzburg
- Known for: Third Law of Thermodynamics; Nernst lamp Nernst equation Nernst effect Nernst heat theorem Nernst potential Nernst–Planck equation Nernst's distribution law
- Spouse: Emma Lohmeyer
- Awards: Pour le Mérite (1917); Nobel Prize in Chemistry (1920); Franklin Medal (1928)
- Scientific career
- Fields: Chemistry
- Workplaces: University of Göttingen; Friedrich Wilhelm University of Berlin; Leipzig University
- Doctoral advisor: Friedrich Kohlrausch
- Other academic advisors: Ludwig Boltzmann
- Doctoral students: Sir Francis Simon; Richard Abegg; Irving Langmuir; Leonid Andrussow; Karl Friedrich Bonhoeffer; Frederick Lindemann; William Duane; Margaret Eliza Maltby; Arnold Eucken
- Other notable students: Gilbert N. Lewis; Max Bodenstein; Robert von Lieben; Kurt Mendelssohn; Theodor Wulf; Emil Bose; Hermann Irving Schlesinger; Claude Hudson

Walther Hermann Nernst (German pronunciation: [ˈvaltɐ ˈnɛʁnst]; 25 June 1864 – 18 November 1941) was a German physical chemist known for his work in thermodynamics, physical chemistry, electrochemistry, and solid-state physics. His formulation of the Nernst heat theorem helped pave the way for the third law of thermodynamics, for which he won the 1920 Nobel Prize in Chemistry. He is also known for developing the Nernst equation in 1887.

He studied physics and mathematics at the University of Zurich, the Friedrich Wilhelm University of Berlin, the University of Graz and the University of Würzburg, where he received his doctorate 1887. In 1889, he finished his habilitation at Leipzig University.

== Life and career ==
=== Early years ===
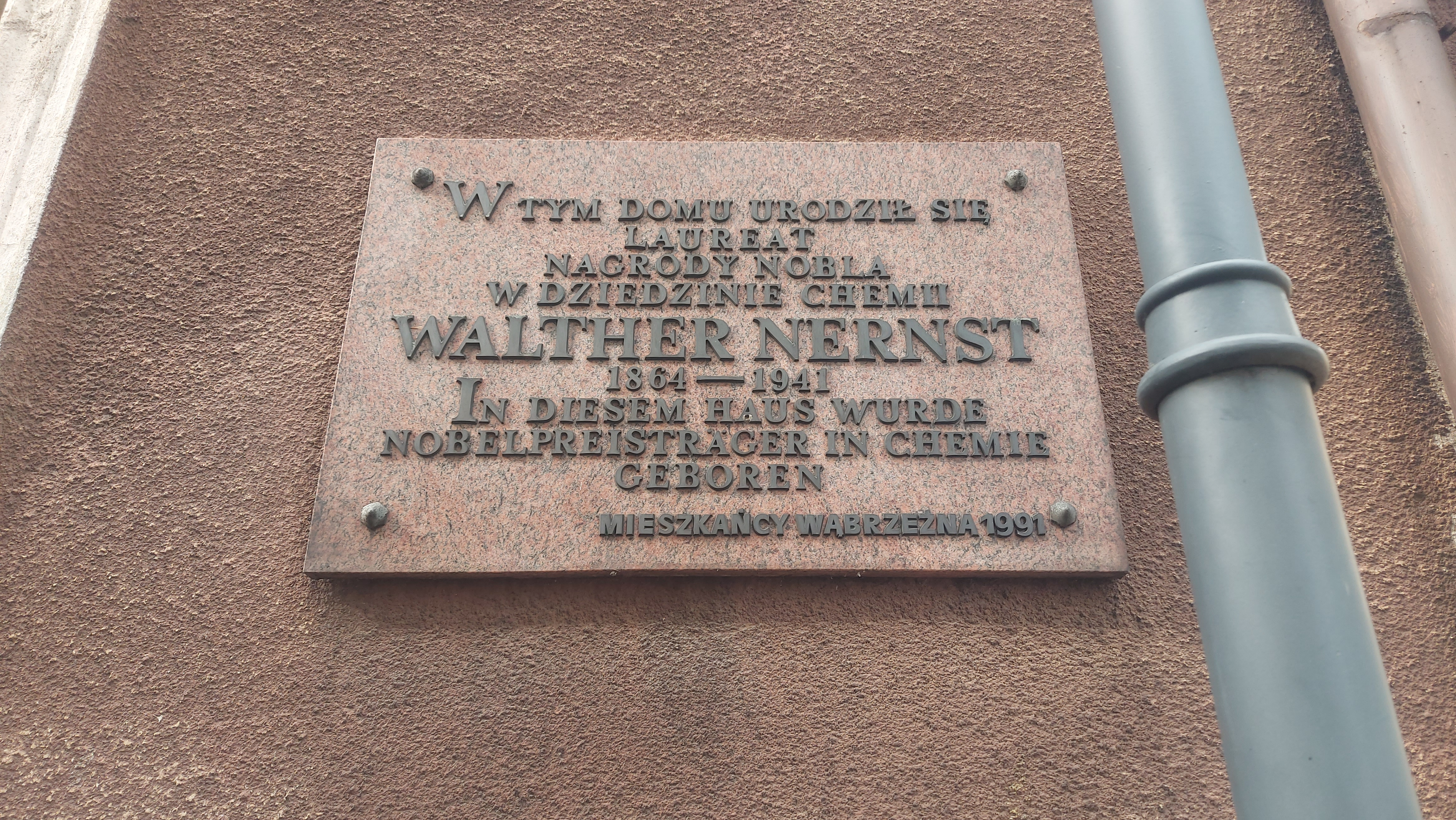
Memorial plaque at Nernst's birthplace in Wąbrzeźno

Nernst was born in Briesen in the Prussian Province of West Prussia (now Wąbrzeźno, Poland) to Gustav Nernst (1827–1888) and Ottilie Nerger (1833–1876). His father was a country judge. Nernst had three older sisters and one younger brother. His third sister died of cholera. Nernst went to elementary school at Graudenz, Prussia (now Grudziądz, Poland).

=== Studies ===
Nernst started undergraduate studies at the University of Zürich in 1883, then after an interlude in Berlin, he returned to Zürich. He wrote his thesis at University of Graz, where Ludwig Boltzmann was professor, though he worked under the direction of Albert von Ettinghausen. They discovered the Ettingshausen and Nernst effects: that a magnetic field applied perpendicular to a metallic conductor in a temperature gradient gives rise to an electrical potential difference, reciprocally, an electric potential difference produces a thermal gradient. Next, he moved to the University of Würzburg under Friedrich Kohlrausch where he submitted and defended his thesis.

=== Professional career ===
Wilhelm Ostwald recruited him to the first department of physical chemistry at Leipzig University. Nernst moved there as an assistant, working on the thermodynamics of electrical currents in solutions. Promoted to lecturer, he taught briefly at the Heidelberg University and then moved to the University of Göttingen. Three years later, he was offered a professorship at the Ludwig-Maximilians-Universität München. To keep him in Prussia the government created a chair for him at Göttingen. There, he wrote a celebrated textbook Theoretical Chemistry, which was translated into English, French, and Russian. He also derived the Nernst equation for the electrical potential generated by unequal concentrations of an ion separated by a membrane that is permeable to the ion. His equation is widely used in cell physiology and neurobiology.

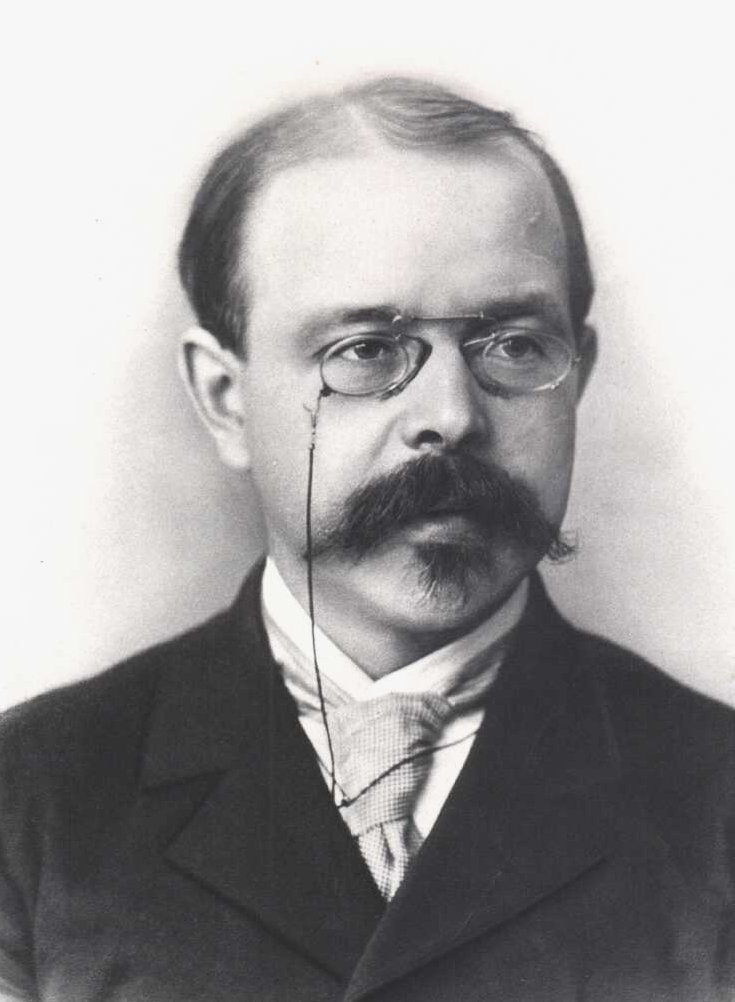
Walther Nernst in 1889.

The carbon electric filament lamp then in use was dim and expensive because it required a vacuum in its bulb. Nernst invented a solid-body radiator with a filament of rare-earth oxides, known as the Nernst glower, it is still important in the field of infrared spectroscopy. Continuous ohmic heating of the filament results in conduction. The glower operates best in wavelengths from 2 to 14 micrometers. It gives a bright light but only after a warm-up period. Nernst sold the patent for one million marks, wisely not opting for royalties because soon the tungsten filament lamp filled with inert gas was introduced. With his riches, Nernst in 1898 bought the first of the eighteen automobiles he owned during his lifetime and a country estate of more than five hundred hectares for hunting. He increased the power of his early automobiles by carrying a cylinder of nitrous oxide that he could inject into the carburetor. After eighteen productive years at Göttingen, investigating osmotic pressure and electrochemistry and presenting a theory of how nerves conduct, he moved to Berlin, and was awarded the title of Geheimrat.

In 1905, he proposed his "New Heat Theorem", later known as the Third law of thermodynamics. He showed that as the temperature approached absolute zero, the entropy approaches zero — while the free energy remains above zero. This is the work for which he is best remembered, as it enabled chemists to determine free energies (and therefore equilibrium points) of chemical reactions from heat measurements. Theodore Richards claimed that Nernst had stolen his idea, but Nernst is almost universally credited with the discovery. Nernst became friendly with Kaiser Wilhelm, whom he persuaded to found the Kaiser Wilhelm Gesellschaft for the Advancement of the Sciences with an initial capital of eleven million marks. Nernst's laboratory discovered that at low temperatures specific heats fell markedly and would probably disappear at absolute zero. This fall was predicted for liquids and solids in a 1909 paper of Albert Einstein's on the quantum mechanics of specific heats at cryogenic temperatures. Nernst was so impressed that he traveled all the way to Zurich to visit Einstein, who was relatively unknown in Zürich in 1909, so people said: "Einstein must be a clever fellow if the great Nernst comes all the way from Berlin to Zürich to talk to him." Nernst and Planck lobbied to establish a special professorship in Berlin and Nernst donated to its endowment. In 1913 they traveled to Switzerland to persuade Einstein to accept it; a dream job: a named professorship at the top university in Germany, without teaching duties, leaving him free for research.

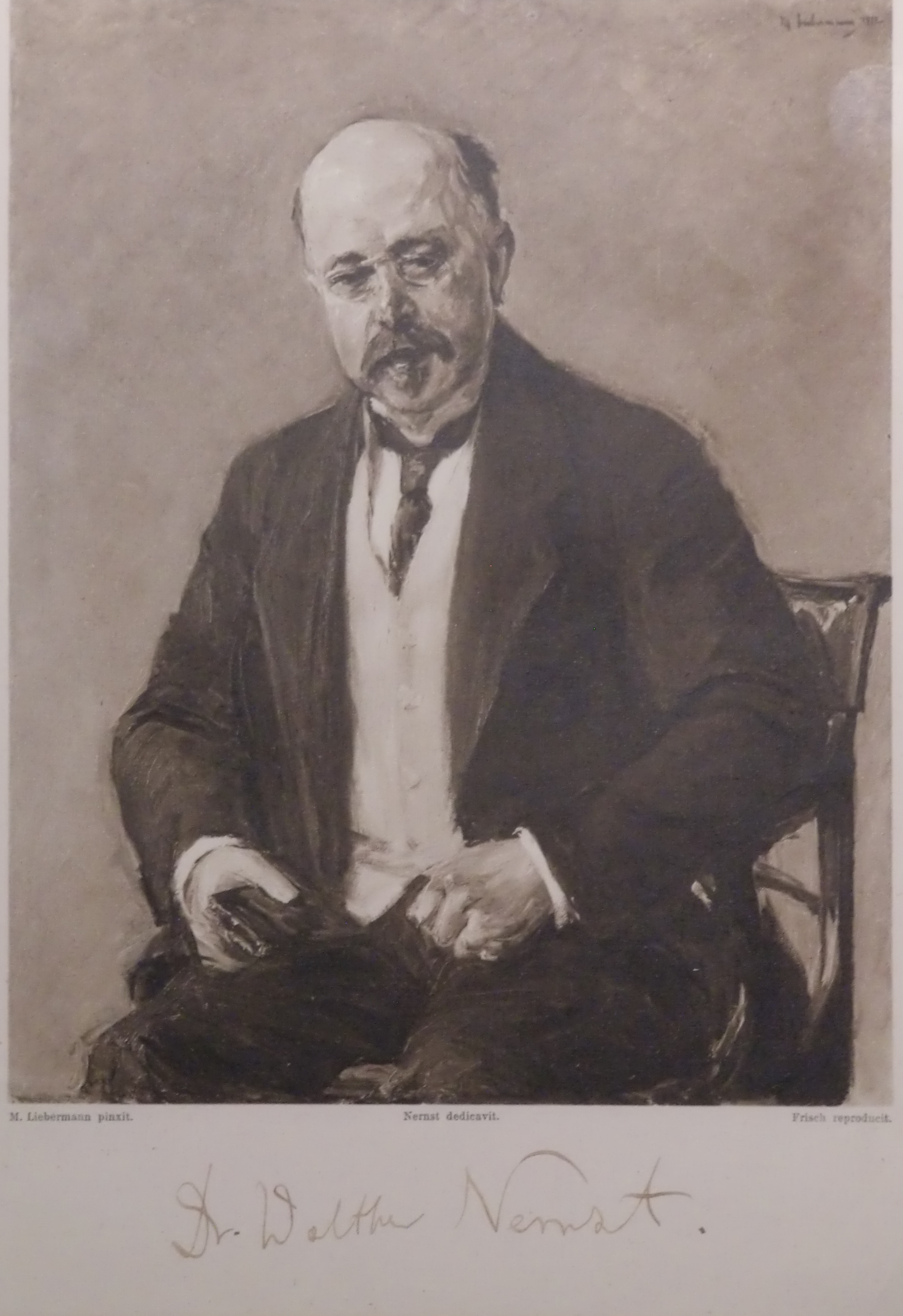
Nernst 1912, portrait by Max Liebermann

In 1911, Nernst and Max Planck organized the first Solvay Conference in Brussels. In the following year, the impressionist painter Max Liebermann painted his portrait.

=== World War I ===
In 1914, the Nernsts were entertaining co-workers and students they had brought to their country estate in a private railway car when they learned that war had been declared. Their two older sons entered the army, while the father enlisted in the voluntary driver's corps. He supported the German army against their opponent's charges of barbarism by signing the Manifesto of the Ninety-Three, On 21 August 1914, he drove documents from Berlin to the commander of the German right wing in France, advancing with them for two weeks until he could see the glow of the Paris lights at night. The tide turned at the battle of the Marne. When the stalemate in the trenches began, he returned home. He contacted Colonel Max Bauer, the staff officer responsible for munitions, with the idea of driving the defenders out of their trenches with shells releasing tear gas. When his idea was tried one of the observers was Fritz Haber, who argued that too many shells would be needed, it would be better to release a cloud of heavier-than-air poisonous gas; the first chlorine cloud attack on 22 April 1915 was not supported by a strong infantry thrust, so the chance that gas would break the stalemate was irrevocably gone. Nernst was awarded the Iron Cross second class. As a Staff Scientific Advisor in the Imperial German Army, he directed research on explosives, much of which was done in his laboratory where they developed guanidine perchlorate. Then he worked on the development of trench mortars. He was awarded the Iron Cross first class and later the Pour le Mérite. When the high command was considering unleashing unrestricted submarine warfare, he asked the Kaiser for an opportunity to warn about the enormous potential of the United States as an adversary. They would not listen, General Erich Ludendorff shouted him down for "incompetent nonsense."

=== Return to research ===
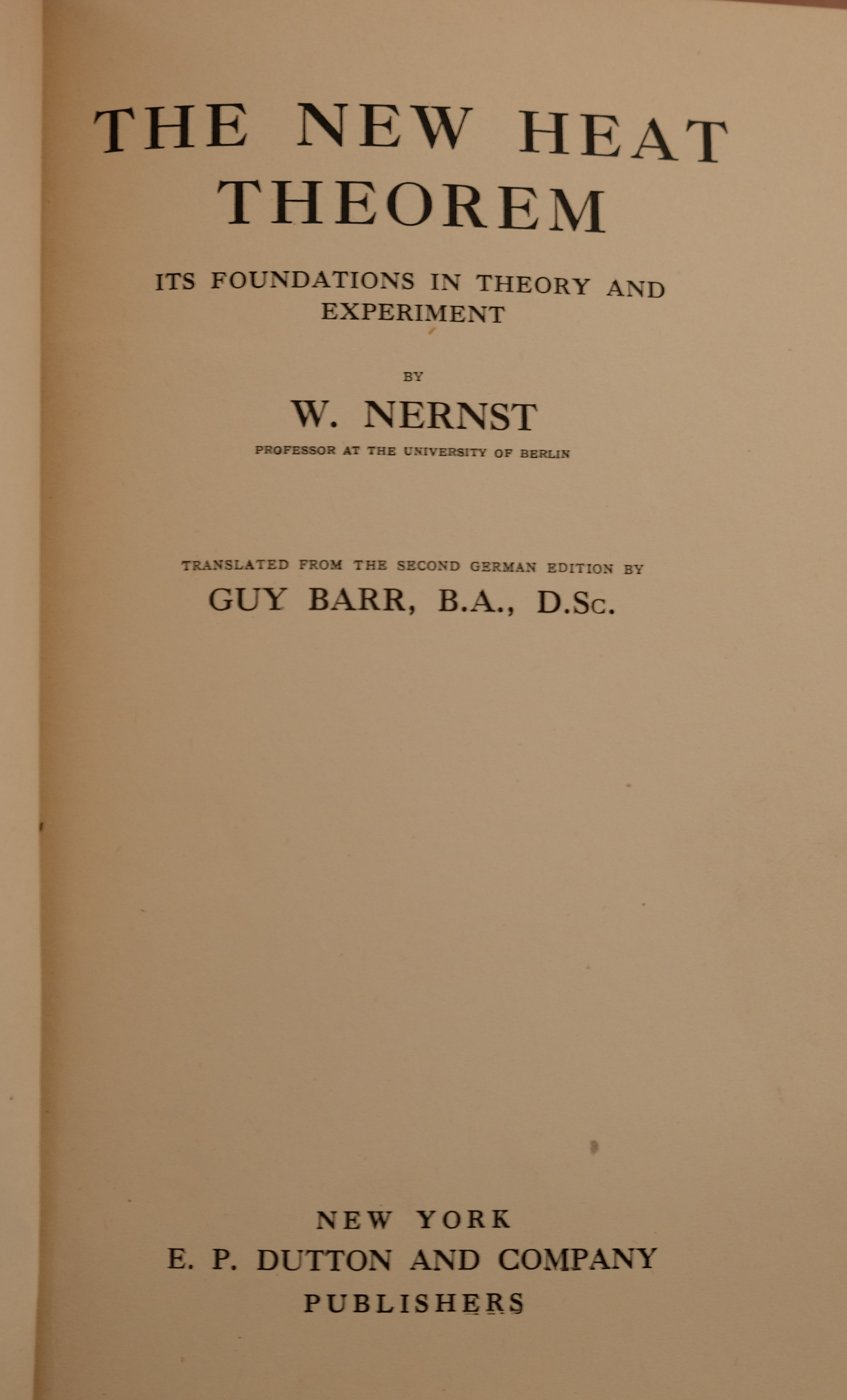
The New Heat Theorem (1926)

Nernst published his book The Foundations of the New Heat Theorem. In 1918, after studying photochemistry, he proposed the atomic chain reaction theory. It stated that when a reaction in which free atoms are formed that can decompose target molecules into more free atoms would result in a chain reaction. His theory is closely related to the natural process of nuclear fission.

In 1920, he and his family briefly fled abroad because he was one of the scientists on the Allied list of war criminals. Later that year he received the Nobel Prize in Chemistry in recognition of his work on thermochemistry. He was elected Rector of the Friedrich Wilhelm University of Berlin for 1921–1922. He set up an agency to channel government and private funds to young scientists and declined becoming Ambassador to the United States. For two unhappy years, he was the president of the Physikalisch-Technische Reichsanstalt (National Physical Laboratory), where he could not cope with the "mixture of mediocrity and red tape". In 1924, he became director of the Institute of Physical Chemistry at Berlin.

In 1927, the decrease in specific heat at low temperatures was extended to gases. He studied the theories of cosmic rays and cosmology.

Although a press release described him as "completely unmusical", Nernst developed an electric piano, the Neo-Bechstein-Flügel in 1930 in association with the Bechstein and Siemens companies, replacing the sounding board with vacuum tube amplifiers. The piano used electromagnetic pickups to produce electronically modified and amplified sound in the same way as an electric guitar. In fact, he was a pianist, sometimes accompanying Einstein's violin.

=== Rejection of antisemitism ===
In 1933, Nernst learned that a colleague, with whom he had hoped to collaborate, had been dismissed from the department because he was a Jew. Nernst immediately taxied to see Haber to request a position in his Institute, which was not controlled by the government, only to learn that Haber was moving to England. Soon, Nernst was in trouble for declining to fill out a government form on his racial origins. He retired from his professorship but was sacked from the board of the Kaiser Wilhelm Institute. He lived quietly in the country; in 1937 he traveled to the University of Oxford to receive an honorary degree, also visiting his eldest daughter, her husband, and his three grandchildren.

=== Death ===
Nernst had a severe heart attack in 1939. He died in 1941 at Zibelle, Germany (now Niwica, Poland). He was buried three times. He was buried the first time near the place of his death. However, his remains were moved to Berlin, where he was buried a second time. Finally they were moved again and buried near the graves of Max Planck, Otto Hahn and Max von Laue in Göttingen, Germany.

== Personal life and family ==
Nernst married Emma Lohmeyer in 1892 with whom he had two sons and three daughters. Both of Nernst's sons died fighting in World War I.

With his colleagues at the University of Leipzig, Jacobus Henricus van’t Hoff and Svante Arrhenius, he was establishing the foundations of a new theoretical and experimental field of inquiry within chemistry and suggested setting fire to unused coal seams to increase the global temperature. He was a vocal critic of Adolf Hitler and of Nazism, and two of his three daughters married Jewish men. After Hitler came to power they emigrated, one to England and the other to Brazil.

=== Personality ===
Nernst was mechanically minded in that he was always thinking of ways to apply new discoveries to industry. His hobbies included hunting and fishing. His friend Albert Einstein was amused by "his childlike vanity and self-complacency" "His own study and laboratory always presented aspects of extreme chaos which his coworkers termed appropriately 'the state of maximum entropy'".

== Honours ==
- 1923, botanist Ignatz Urban published Nernstia, which is a genus of flowering plants from Mexico, in the family Rubiaceae and named in his honour.
- Honorary membership of the Manchester Literary and Philosophical Society 5 April 1910.

== Publications ==
- Walther Nernst, "Reasoning of theoretical chemistry: Nine papers (1889–1921)" (Ger., Begründung der Theoretischen Chemie : Neun Abhandlungen, 1889–1921). Frankfurt am Main : Verlag Harri Deutsch, c. 2003. ISBN 3-8171-3290-5
- Walther Nernst, "The theoretical and experimental bases of the New Heat Theorem" (Ger., Die theoretischen und experimentellen Grundlagen des neuen Wärmesatzes). Halle [Ger.] W. Knapp, 1918 [tr. 1926]. [ed., this is a list of thermodynamical papers from the physico-chemical institute of the University of Berlin (1906–1916); Translation available by Guy Barr LCCN 27-2575
- Walther Nernst, "Theoretical chemistry from the standpoint of Avogadro's law and thermodynamics" (Ger., Theoretische Chemie vom Standpunkte der Avogadroschen Regel und der Thermodynamik). Stuttgart, F. Enke, 1893 [5th edition, 1923]. LCCN po28-417

== See also ==
- German inventors and discoverers
- Chain reaction
- Cosmological constant problem
- Cosmic background radiation
- History of electrophoresis
- Nernst–Einstein equation
- Nernst–Lewis–Latimer convention
- Solid state ionics
- Stochastic electrodynamics
- Threshold potential
- Tired light
- Zero-point energy

== Cited sources ==
- Stone, A. Douglas (2013) Einstein and the Quantum. Princeton University Press. ISBN 1-4915-3104-5
