= Andrussow process =

Process for industrial production of hydrogen cyanide

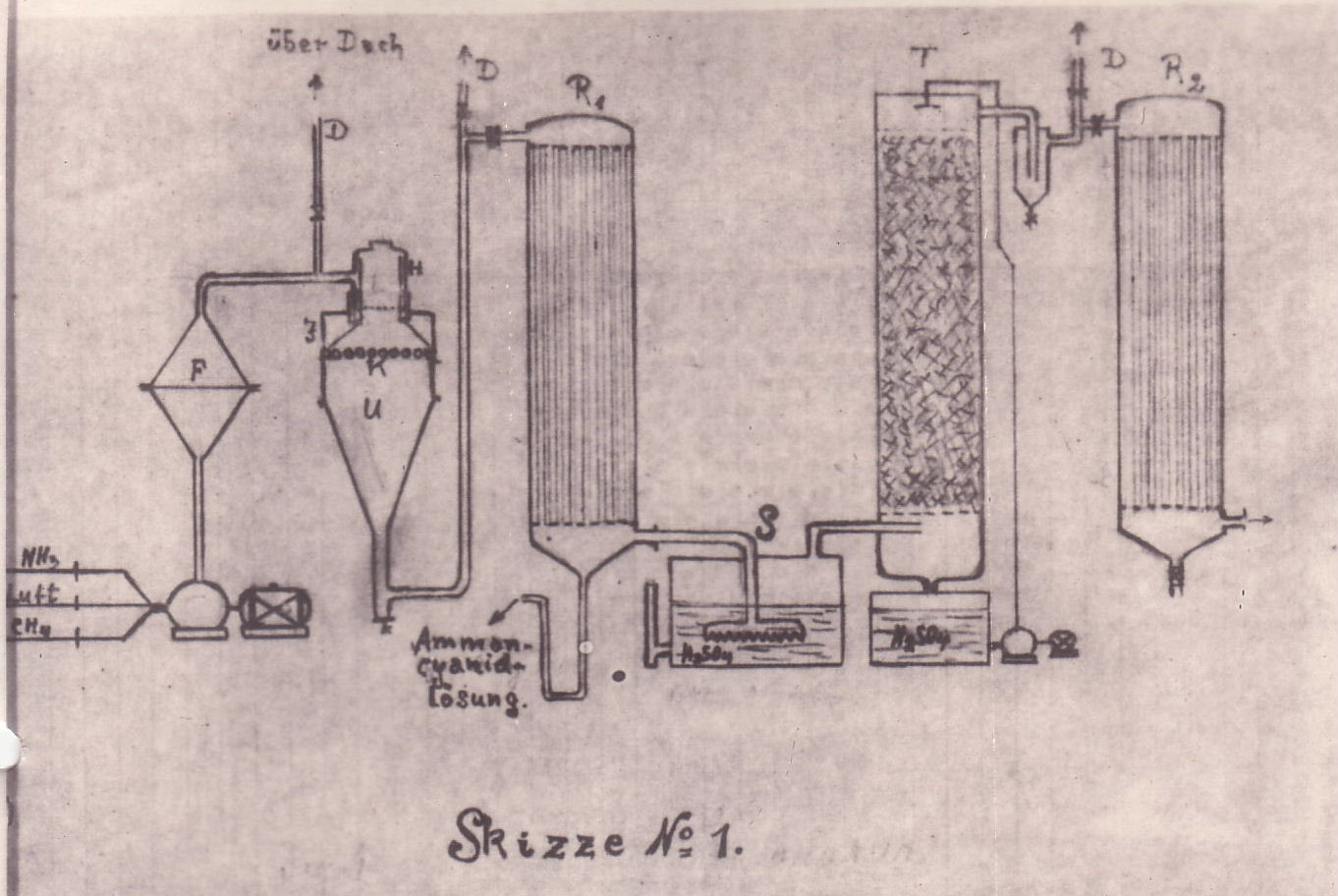
Diagram from 1931 showing the Andrussow process

The Andrussow process is the dominant industrial process for the production of hydrogen cyanide. It involves the reaction of methane, ammonia, and oxygen. The process is catalyzed by a platinum-rhodium alloy.

2 CH_{4} + 2 NH_{3} + 3 O_{2} → 2 HCN + 6 H_{2}O

Hydrogen cyanide is highly valued for the production or acrylonitrile and adiponitrile, as well as alkali metal salts such as potassium cyanide.

== Process details ==
This reaction is very exothermic. The change of enthalpy of this reaction is equal to -481.06 kJ. The heat provided by the main reaction serves as a catalyst for other side reactions.

CH_{4} + H_{2}O → CO + 3 H_{2}
2 CH_{4} + 3 O_{2} → 2 CO + 4 H_{2}O
4 NH_{3} + 3 O_{2} → 2 N_{2} + 6 H_{2}O

These side reactions can be minimized by only short exposures to the catalyst of the order of 0.0003 s.

== Historical articles ==
The process is based on a reaction that was discovered by Leonid Andrussow in 1927. In the following years he developed the process that is named after him. HCN is also produced in the BMA process.
