= Ettinghausen =

Ettinghausen may refer to:

- Ettinghausen, Germany, Westerwaldkreis, Rhineland-Palatinate
- Richard Ettinghausen (1906–1979), German Jewish historian of Islamic art and chief curator of the Freer Gallery
- Walter Eytan (born Ettinghausen, 1910–2001), Israeli diplomat
- Maurice Sachs (born Ettinghausen, 1906–1945), French Jewish writer

== See also ==
- Ettingshausen (disambiguation)
