= Distribution law =

Distribution of a solute between two immiscible solvents

Distribution law or the Nernst's distribution law gives a generalisation which governs the distribution of a solute between two immiscible solvents. This law was first given by Nernst who studied the distribution of several solutes between different appropriate pairs of solvents.

C_{1}/C_{2} = K_{d}

Where K_{d} is called the distribution coefficient or the partition coefficient. Concentration of X in solvent A/concentration of X in solvent B=Kď If C_{1} denotes the concentration of solute X in solvent A & C_{2} denotes the concentration of solute X in solvent B; Nernst's distribution law can be expressed as C_{1}/C_{2} = K_{d}. This law is only valid if the solute is in the same molecular form in both the solvents. Sometimes the solute dissociates or associates in the solvent. In such cases the law is modified as, D(Distribution factor)=concentration of solute in all forms in solvent 1/concentration of solute in all forms in solvent 2.
