= Von Ettingshausen =

von Ettingshausen is a surname. Notable people with the surname include:

- Albert von Ettingshausen (1850–1932), Austrian physicist
- Andreas von Ettingshausen (1796–1878), German mathematician and physicist
- Colin von Ettingshausen (born 1971), German rower
- Constantin von Ettingshausen (1826–1897), Austrian geologist and botanist
