= BMA process =

Chemical process for the production of hydrogen cyanide

The BMA process or Degussa process is a chemical process developed by the German chemical company Degussa for the production of hydrogen cyanide from methane and ammonia in presence of a platinum catalyst. Hydrogen cyanide is used in the chemical industry for the production of intermediate chemicals like acrylonitrile, methyl methacrylate, and adiponitrile.

The name is abbreviated from Blausäure (hydrogen cyanide) from Methan (methane) and Ammoniak (ammonia) in German.

The reaction equation is analog to the steam methane reforming (SMR) reaction of methane and water:

CH_{4} + NH_{3} → HCN + 3 H_{2}, ΔH_{R} = 251 kJ / mol

The reaction is extremely endothermic. The reactants react in a Platinum-covered pipe at approximately 1400 °C. The reaction mixture contains around 23 Vol.-% HCN and 72 Vol.-% H_{2} as well as minor quantities of ammonia, nitrogen, and unreacted methane.

The gaseous mixture is introduced in a scrubber and treated with an ammonia solution (producing ammonium cyanide) allowing the other gaseous components: H_{2}, CH_{4}, and N_{2} to pass through. In a second step the HCN is released by acidification of the solution, followed by a final distillation of the hydrogen cyanide. Because of the highly endothermic reaction, the BMA process is of lower importance for the production of HCN compared to the Andrussow process.
