= Jakob Pöschl =

Austrian physicist and university teacher

- Born: February 25, 1828; Vienna, Austrian Empire
- Died: January 6, 1907 (aged 78); Graz, Austria-Hungary
- Other names: Jacob Pöschl, Jakob Poeschl, Jacob Poeschl
- Occupation: Physicist

Jakob Pöschl (25 February 1828 in Vienna – 6 January 1907 in Graz) was an Austrian physicist and university teacher.

== Biography ==
After graduating from Gymnasium Pöschl studied philosophy for two years at the University of Vienna. From 1846 to 1851 he studied at the Vienna Polytechnic Institute. He obtained permission to teach in Realschulen in mathematics and physics. From 1851 onwards he worked as a teacher, first in Vienna and later in Brno. In 1855 Pöschl was appointed first professor for experimental and technical physics at the Joanneum in Graz. In 1871–72 he was rector of the university. Pöschl retired in 1887 and was succeeded by Albert von Ettingshausen. Pöschl passed away in his house located at Klosterwiesgasse 19 after a long period of suffering on 6 January 1907. He was buried at the Graz St. Peter cemetery.

Jakob Pöschl married Magdalena, née Nömayer (born 1849, alternative spellings: Nömeyer or Nomayr) in 1870 in the Graz Parish Church. The Pöschls had five children, three of them being scientists and working at universities as well: Son Arnold (born 1880) was a professor of canon law and rector of the University of Graz, Theodor (born 1882) was a mathematician and engineer in Karlsruhe, and Viktor (born 1884) was a chemist and rector of the Handelshochschule Mannheim. Historic sources state that son Fritz Pöschl studied medicine and daughter Maria married Dr. Karl Schadelbauer, a spa physician, on 16 April 1901. The German-Austrian classical philologist Viktor Pöschl was a grandson of Jakob Pöschl.

== Work ==
Jakob Pöschl is most known for his role as a university teacher. His most prominent student in Graz was Nikola Tesla, whose 1919 autobiography My Inventions mentions Pöschl's demonstration of a Gramme electric generator as an inspiration in his development of an Induction motor. Pöschl's role in Tesla's university education is documented by the local press as early as in 1892–1893 (whereas to current knowledge and in contrast to that early sources Tesla never finished his studies in Graz). Pöschl repeatedly donated scholarships and prizes which were – together with other grants – awarded during the annual celebration of the founding of the Joanneum on 26 November.
