= Anna Köhler (scientist) =

German physicist

- Education: University of Cambridge; Karlsruhe Institute of Technology
- Scientific career
- Workplaces: University of Cambridge; King's College London; University of Potsdam; University of Bayreuth
- Doctoral advisor: Richard Friend

Anna Köhler FRSC is a German physicist who is a Professor of Physics at the University of Bayreuth. Her research considers electronic processes in organic and organometallic molecules. She makes use of optical and electrical spectroscopy to better understand photo-physical processes. In 2020, she became the first woman to win the Max Born Medal and Prize.

== Early life and education ==
Köhler is from Germany.

Köhler enrolled at the University of Karlsruhe (TH) in Karlsruhe, Germany in 1989, receiving a diploma in physics in 1998 (based on the date of her last exam) and an intermediate diploma in mathematics in 1992. In the meantime, Köhler also attended the University of Cambridge, UK from 1992 to 1997, achieving a Masters in mathematics (1993) and a PhD through a fellowship at Cavendish Laboratory at the University of Cambridge, UK (1997).

== Research and career ==
Köhler was appointed Professor of Physics and Chair of Soft Matter Optoelectronics at the University of Bayreuth in 2007. Her research considers organic semiconducting materials for solar cells and light-emitting diodes. In particular, Köhler has studied the spin states of organic semiconductors. Köhler was made executive director of the University of Bayreuth Centre of International Excellence in 2019.. In 2022, Köhler was elected as a full member of the section III of the Bavarian Academy of Sciences and Humanities, the fourth scientist and the first woman ever to do so.

She is the lead of a Horizon 2020 international training network on thermally activated delayed fluorescence (TADF) OLEDs. She is interested in the photophysical processes leading to bright OLEDs, as well as in those making organic solar cells more efficient.

Köhler is also an Associate Investigator for the Australian Research Council Centre of Excellence in Exciton Science.

== Awards and honours ==
- 1989 Fulbright Program Scholarship
- 1999 Royal Society University Research Fellowship
- 2019 Alexander Todd – Hans Krebs lectureship
- 2020 Max Born Medal and Prize

== Selected publications ==
- Brown, Peter J.; Thomas, D. Steve; Köhler, Anna; Wilson, Joanne S.; Kim, Ji-Seon; Ramsdale, Catherine M.; Sirringhaus, Henning; Friend, Richard H. (28 February 2003). "Effect of interchain interactions on the absorption and emission of poly(3-hexylthiophene)". Physical Review B. 67 (6) 064203. Bibcode:2003PhRvB..67f4203B. doi:10.1103/PhysRevB.67.064203.
- Wilson, J. S.; Dhoot, A. S.; Seeley, A. J. a. B.; Khan, M. S.; Köhler, A.; Friend, R. H. (2001). "Spin-dependent exciton formation in π-conjugated compounds". Nature. 413 (6858): 828–831. Bibcode:2001Natur.413..828W. doi:10.1038/35101565. ISSN 1476-4687. PMID 11677602. S2CID 4424118.
- Köhler, A.; Bässler, H. (30 November 2009). "Triplet states in organic semiconductors". Materials Science and Engineering: R: Reports. 66 (4): 71–109. Bibcode:2009MSEnR..66...71K. doi:10.1016/j.mser.2009.09.001. ISSN 0927-796X.

=== Books ===
- Köhler, Anna (2015). Electronic processes in organic semiconductors: an introduction. Bässler, Heinz. Weinheim, Germany: Wiley-VCH Verlag GmbH & Co. ISBN 978-3-527-68517-2. OCLC 905348805.
