= University of Graz =

Public university in Graz, Styria

- Universität Graz
- Latin: Alma Universitas Graecensis Carolo Franciscea
- Type: Public
- Established: 1585; 441 years ago
- Academic affiliations: ASEA-UNINET; CEI; CG; Utrecht Network; IAU
- Endowment: €315 million
- Rector: Peter Riedler
- Faculty: 3,292
- Administrative staff: 1,439
- Students: 27,585 (2024)
- Location: Graz, Styria, Austria; 47°04′41″N 15°26′57″E
- Campus: Urban
- Nobel Laureates: 6
- Colours: Yellow and black
- Website: uni-graz.at

The University of Graz (German: Universität Graz, formerly: Karl-Franzens-Universität Graz) in Graz is the largest public research university in Styria and the second oldest university in Austria. Its name is derived from Archduke Charles II of Inner Austria and Francis I of Austria. The University of Graz was founded on 1 January 1585.

The Faculty of Medicine was spun off as the Medical University of Graz on 1 January 2004, under the University Act 2002.

== History ==
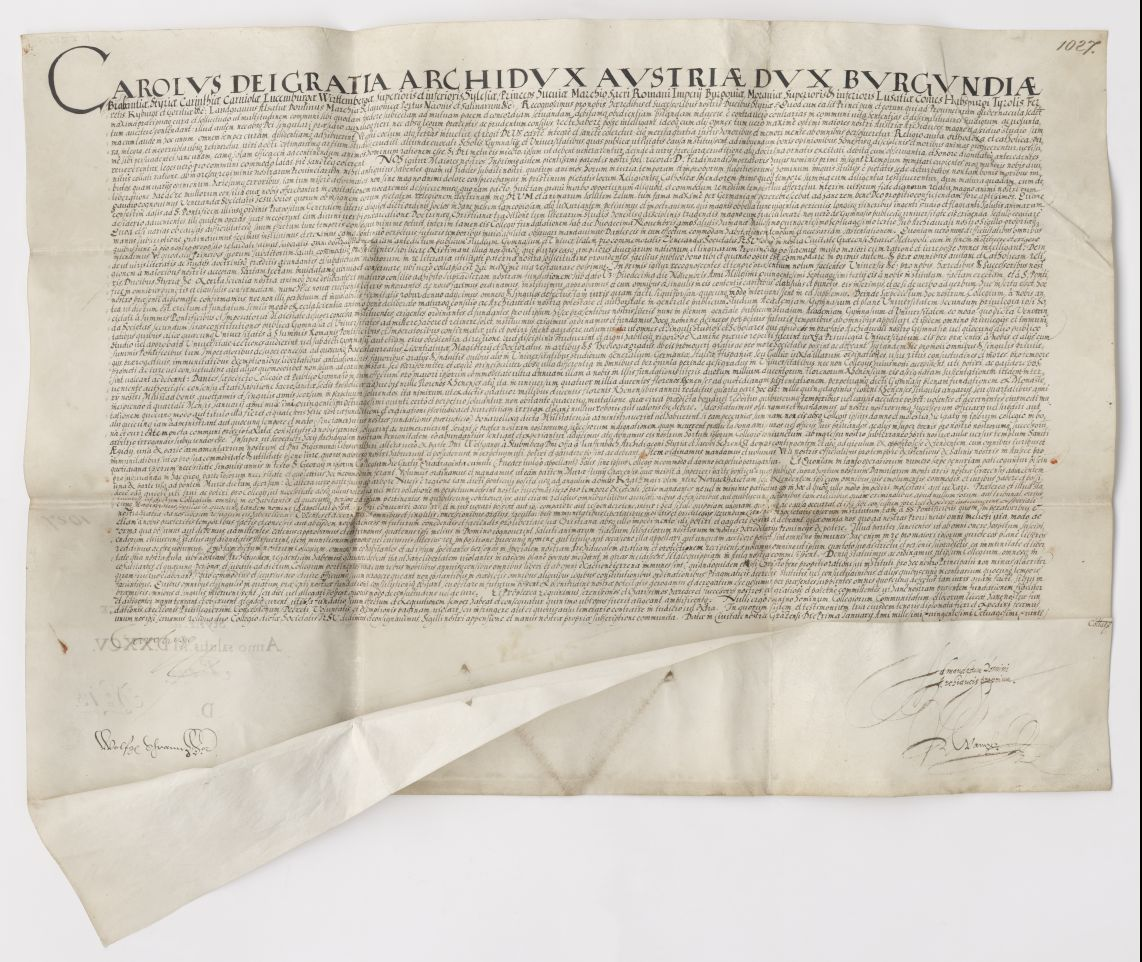
Foundation letter from the University of Graz, Archduke Charles II, 1 January 1585; Styrian Provincial Archives I.Ö., Document No. 575, 1585 I 1, Graz

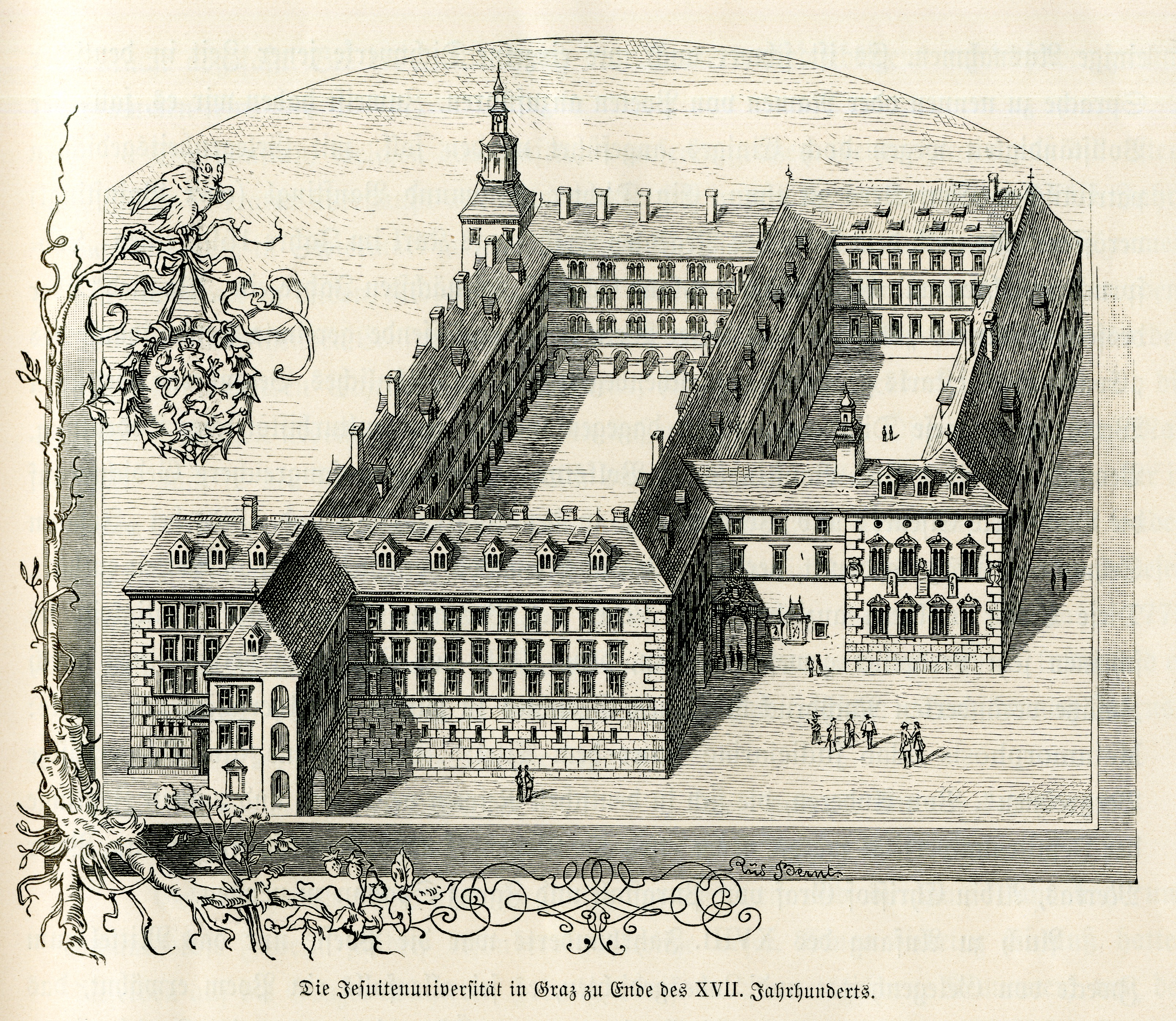
Engraving of the old Jesuit University in Graz

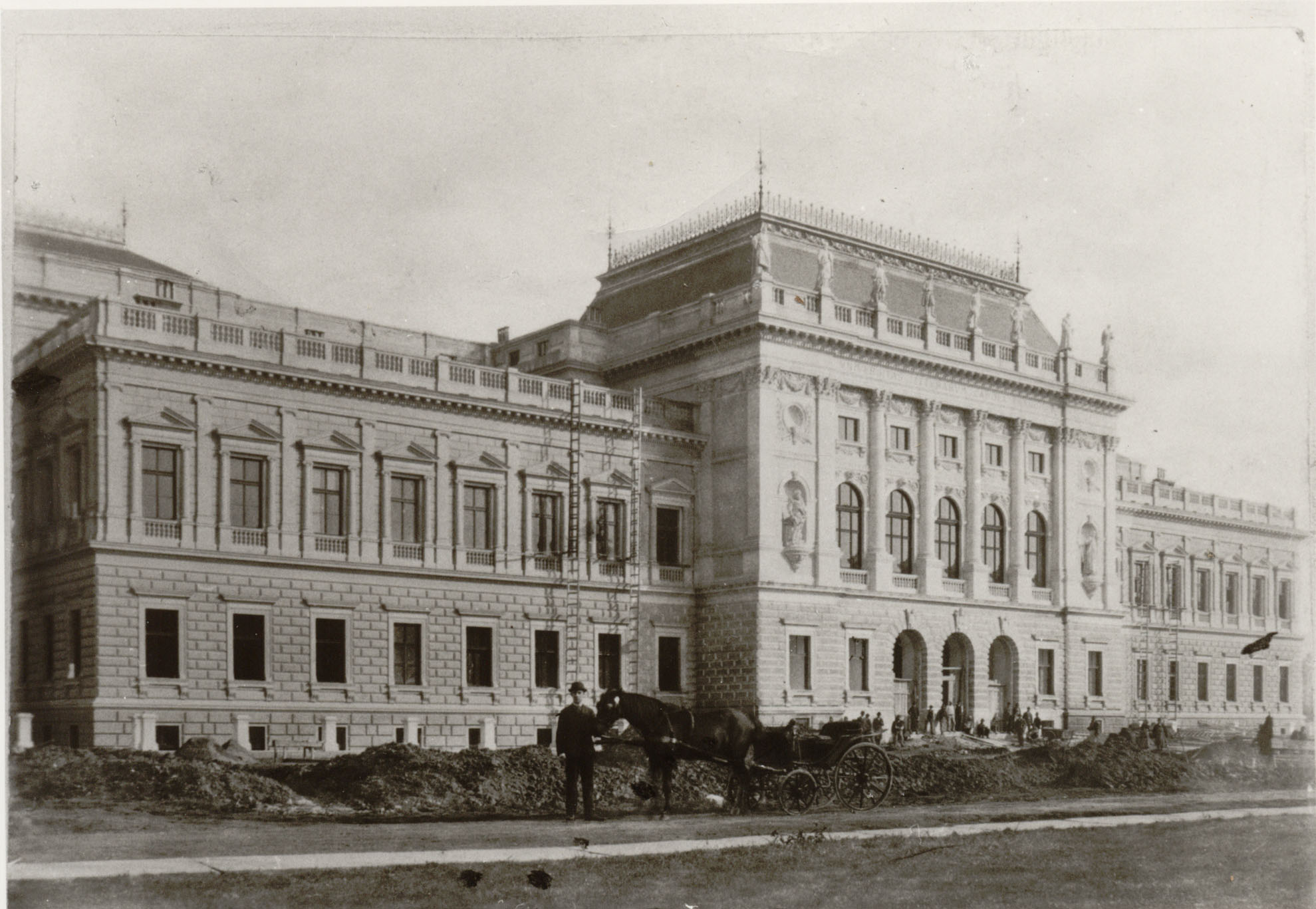
Construction of the main building in 1894

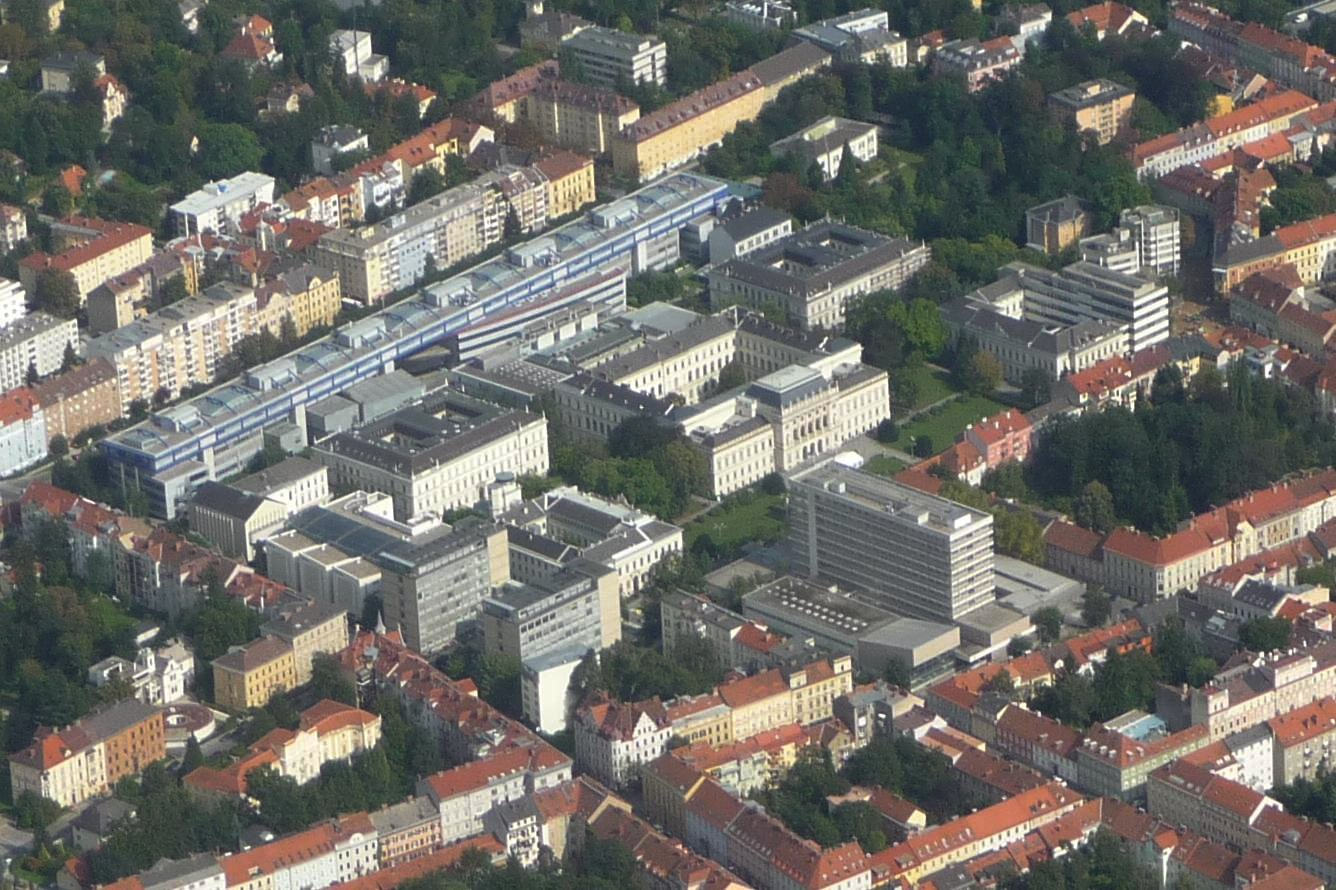
Aerial view of the campus (2011)

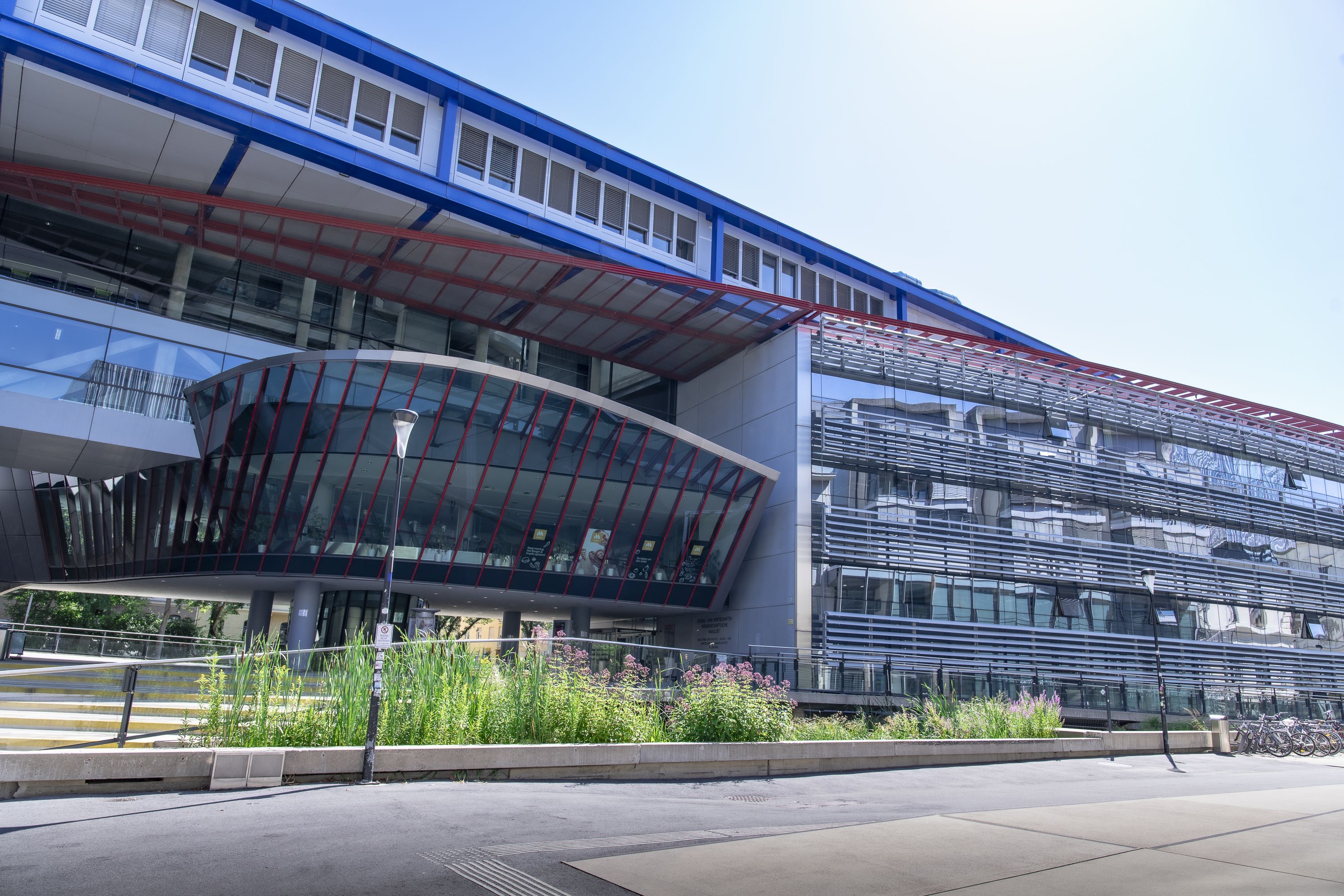
Building housing the Faculty of Law and the Faculty of Social and Economic Sciences (ReSoWi) at the University of Graz (2024)

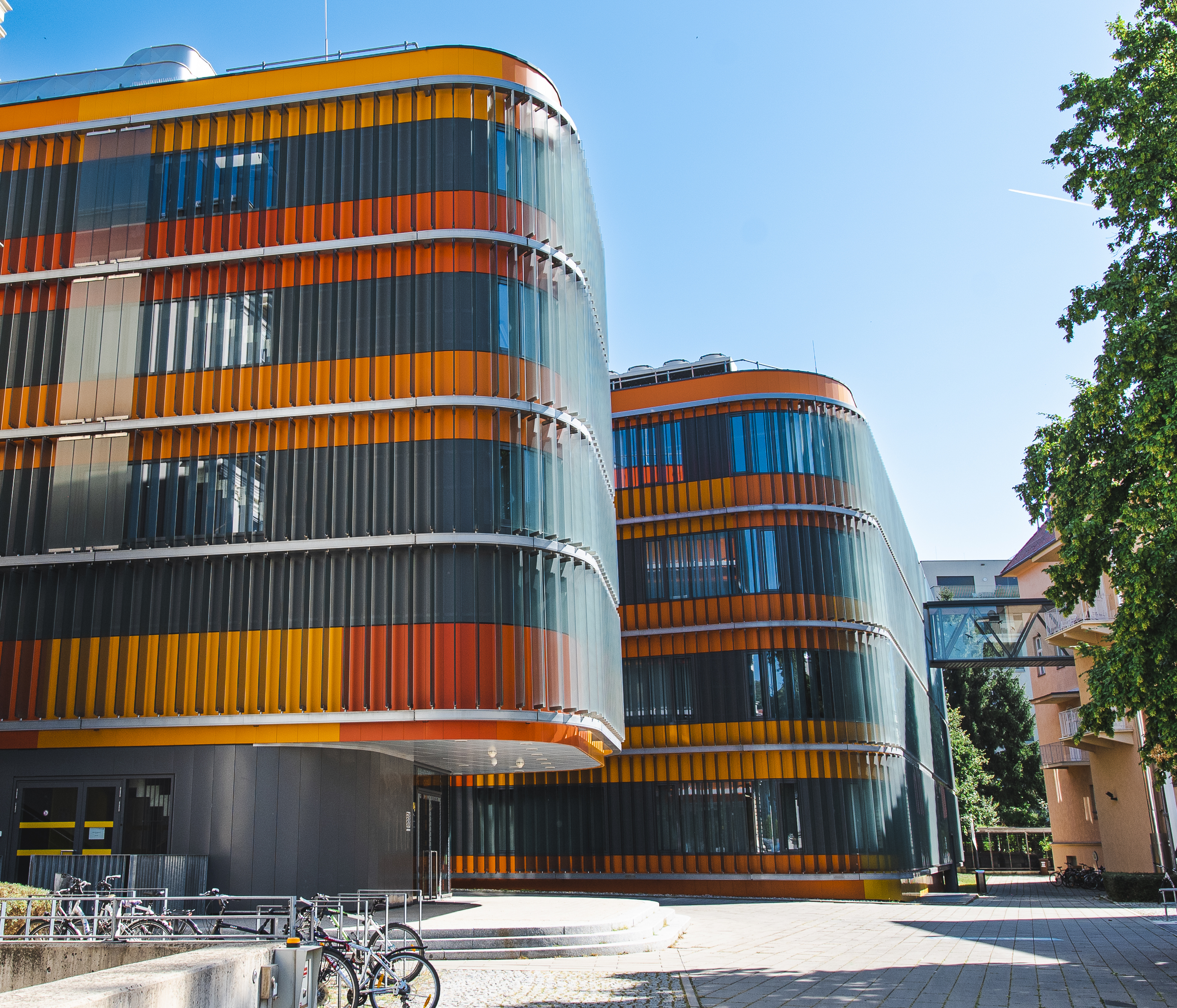
The Center for Molecular Biology at the University of Graz (2024)

=== Founding phase ===
During the Reformation, numerous citizens and nobles from Styria emigrated to universities in protestant principalities of the Holy Roman Empire. The Catholic rulers of Styria wanted to counteract this development by drawing up a plan to establish a university in Graz under the leadership of the Jesuits. The university was founded on 1 January 1585, by Archduke Charles II of Inner Austria, but it was not until 14 April 1586, that the foundation charter, together with the scepter and seal, were ceremoniously presented to the provincial superior of the Societas Jesu and, at the same time, the first rector, Father Heinrich Blyssem SJ (1526–1586), in the Graz parish church of St. Ägidius, today's Graz Cathedral.

The princely foundation was sealed by a papal and an imperial letter of confirmation, granting the university autonomy and special judicial and tax privileges. Originally, the sovereign planned a comprehensive university with four faculties, but initially there were to be only two. The Faculty of Theology was tasked with creating a new, reliable catholic clergy, and the Faculty of Arts dealt with the teaching of the liberal arts (septem artes liberales) – the philosophical disciplines.

In 1607, the lecture halls were moved to the new building erected by Archduke Ferdinand II on the corner of Hofgasse and Bürgergasse, which is now known as the "Old University." Over time, the originally free-standing building was connected to the college to form a single complex. Classes were held on the ground floor of the building, while the two large rooms on the upper floor served as an auditorium. The Old University in the center of Graz remains virtually unchanged to this day and is used by the provincial government of Styria for representative purposes.

=== 1607 to 1827 ===
As early as the beginning of the 17th century, discussions began about expanding the University of Graz to include a law and medical faculty. However, the Jesuits successfully opposed the establishment of the new faculties for more than 100 years. Nevertheless, from 1648 onwards, the Styrian estates financed a one-year course in Roman law. After the abolition of the Jesuit Order in 1773, the university was taken over by the state and the Jesuits at the Faculty of Theology were replaced without exception by secular clergy. The aims of the education were to train loyal civil servants and to impart exclusively practical knowledge. The Faculty of Law was founded in 1778.

The accession to power in the Habsburg Empire by Emperor Joseph II and the Josephine reforms he promoted had a major impact on all universities, including the University of Graz. In 1782, it was converted into a lyceum and thus lost most of its privileges. The number of professorships was limited. At the same time, medical and surgical training was established in Graz, although doctorates were still only possible in the subjects of theology and philosophy. Only lower-level courses were offered in the fields of law and medicine.

After the death of Emperor Joseph II, the Styrian estates immediately demanded the reestablishment of the university. After the University of Innsbruck was reestablished in 1826, the Styrian estates also submitted a request for the reestablishment of the University of Graz, including a medical faculty. Emperor Francis I granted the request and re-established the University of Graz in 1827. This double foundation is the origin of the university's old name, "Karl-Franzens-Universität."

=== 1827 to 1918 ===
With the exception of the right to award doctorates to lawyers, the university's re-establishment did not bring about any significant changes. At that time, the university had 23 teaching staff and did not improve significantly until 1848. As a result, many students also attended courses at the Joanneum, founded in 1811, the predecessor of today's Graz University of Technology.

Although the revolutionary year of 1848 was not as turbulent in Graz as it was in Vienna, students and professors at the University of Graz and the Joanneum demanded that the sovereign end censorship and expand freedom of teaching and learning with a high degree of autonomy for the university in accordance with the principles of Wilhelm von Humboldt. These demands were partially granted by the state parliament on 3 April 1848.

In the following years, general study regulations were enacted and separate faculty studies were created. In the 1860s, a further wave of liberalization began. After many years of effort, the Faculty of Medicine at the University of Graz became a reality in 1863, making it a comprehensive university. In 1871, a new university building was approved. The first building was ready for occupancy in 1872, and the new construction was finally completed in 1895 with the opening of the new main building. However, the university administration soon announced that it needed more space. As a result, the university acquired additional building land in the vicinity of the campus until 1914. In 1912, the medical faculty was able to move into the new clinics on the grounds of the provincial hospital Graz. Concrete expansion plans were already in place in 1913, but these were shelved with the outbreak of World War I.

In the period before World War I, the University of Graz was home to numerous renowned researchers, such as Ernst Mach, Ludwig Boltzmann, Albert von Ettingshausen, Hans Groß, and many more. The discoverer of cosmic rays, Victor Franz Hess, also received his doctorate from the University of Graz in 1906. In 1898, Seraphine Puchleitner became the first woman to be admitted to study at the University of Graz. In 1902, she received her doctorate in geography, becoming the first woman to do so at the University of Graz. In 1905, Oktavia Aigner-Rollett became the first practicing female doctor to receive her doctorate in Graz.

The outbreak of the World War I marked a turning point for the University of Graz, resulting in a significant reduction in student numbers and a drastic cut in financial resources. The era of austerity at universities in Austria was to last for almost 50 years.

=== First Republic (1918–1933) ===
The first years after World War I were marked by political and economic uncertainty for the University of Graz, which also affected the reputation of science among the population. Research was no longer seen as a means to the end of the common good, but served the national political goal of advancement. The University of Graz therefore focused primarily on students from Austria, while students from abroad were merely tolerated.

The government in Vienna was critical of the autonomy of universities, while the universities themselves tried to preserve it. The University of Graz, for example, established its own "Senate Committee for Political Issues," which defined the university's position on all political issues. The role of women in science improved somewhat. After the competence of Germanist Christine Touaillon for a habilitation at the Faculty of Philosophy was questioned in 1920 on the basis of her gender, Dora Boerner-Patzelt became the first woman to habilitate in histology and embryology at the University of Graz in 1929.

A novelty from 1919 onwards was the election of student representatives, which in the following years was marked by competition between German nationalist and Catholic representatives. What united both groups, however, was their rejection of students from the socialist camp. In 1924/25, a list that can be classified as a National Socialist group ran for the first time. In the 1930/31 student representative elections at the University of Graz, openly National Socialist students from the NSDStB ran for office for the first time.

Between 1931 and 1933, the Great Depression led to a drastic deterioration in the budgetary situation of all universities. This led to a campaign in the Wiener Zeitung in September 1931 against the "provincial universities" in Innsbruck, Graz, and Leoben, with the closure of the University of Graz even being considered, which led to protests in Graz. The plans were never realized, but a reduction in academic staff could not be prevented.

Despite these rigid austerity measures, the universities managed to maintain their autonomy until 1933. After the National Socialists came to power in Germany, the political situation escalated. In May 1933, the Constitutional Court was abolished, which led to massive resistance from the law faculties of the universities of Innsbruck, Vienna, and Graz. These constant conflicts between the government and the universities ultimately led to the abolition of university autonomy and the dissolution of all student bodies in the summer of 1933. The measure was justified by the influence of the NSDAP on students, which was particularly strong in Graz, among other places.

=== Dictatorship/Corporative State (1934–1938) ===
From the winter semester of 1933/34 onwards, Austria's universities were completely under the control of the Austro-Fascist government in Vienna under the responsible minister Kurt Schuschnigg. In the years that followed, extensive purges took place at all universities in the country, and the University of Graz was no exception, with a third of its professors affected. Furthermore, numerous disciplinary proceedings were brought against students. From 1935 onwards, universities were obliged to ensure that students were educated to become "moral personalities in the spirit of patriotic community." Around one-fifth of the students at the University of Graz failed these examinations.

Despite all this repression, the University of Graz continued to excel in the field of science. Until 1938, Nobel Prize winners Erwin Schrödinger, Otto Loewi, and Victor Franz Hess, among others, conducted research at the University of Graz.

=== National Socialism (1938–1945) ===
After the "Anschluss" of Austria in 1938, the universities were immediately brought into line. Large sections of the teaching staff had already been infiltrated by National Socialists and actively contributed to the process of Gleichschaltung. At the University of Graz, Josef Dobretsberger resigned as rector on 12 March 1938, under pressure from National Socialist students and teachers. Only three days later, his interim successor, Adolf Zauner, sent words of thanks to Adolf Hitler for the "long-awaited union with the German Reich."

In April and May 1938, systematic purges of the teaching staff took place, during which political opponents, "foreign race" teachers, and those "unsuitable in character" were removed. Twenty-one teachers were "suspended" or had their teaching licenses revoked "until further notice," including Nobel Prize winner Viktor Franz Hess, a member of the Federal Cultural Council, and ancient historian Franz Schehl. The University of Graz felt compelled to dismiss Nobel Prize winner Otto Loewi and the regional rabbi and professor of Semitic philology David Herzog on the basis of their Jewish heritage in accordance with the Nuremberg Race Laws. "Politically unreliable" individuals such as the third Graz Nobel Prize winner, Erwin Schrödinger, who was expelled shortly thereafter, were also forced to leave the university. On the basis of the "Ordinance on the Reorganization of the Civil Service" of 4 June 1938, another wave of purges took place until the end of August. By the end of the Nazi regime, 20 professors, 14 lecturers, and 13 assistants had been dismissed from the University of Graz.

Students were also persecuted and expelled on the basis of "racial" and "political criteria." The number of students fell from 2,015 in the winter semester of 1937/38 to 1,422 in the summer semester of 1939. According to the "Nuremberg Laws," Jewish citizens were prohibited from enrolling for the summer semester of 1938. Jewish students were still allowed to take their final exams until the end of the summer semester and received their doctorates "quietly," i.e., without an academic ceremony. After the Reichspogromnacht in November 1938, Jews were completely excluded from universities. With the start of the World War II, advertising for attendance at scientific universities was banned throughout the Reich, which also led to a further decline in student numbers in Graz.

=== Occupation period (1945–1955) ===
Immediately after the end of World War II, the Allies emphasized the central importance of re-democratizing universities. As institutions that shaped the population and were responsible for education, they were of crucial importance. Accordingly, denazification was not only aimed at removing sympathizers of the former Nazi regime from public service, but also at conveying the advantages of institutional and intellectual independence to the general population.

However, Austria's "victim myth" made this undertaking considerably more difficult. In addition, anti-Semitism had already shaped employment policy and everyday life among students at the University of Graz in the decades before the Second World War.

The initial assessment of the purge commissions was therefore sobering: in 1946, only nine of the 79 professors and private lecturers employed at the University of Graz were deemed to be untainted. By 1947, denazification at Austrian universities had already come to a standstill. In 1948, an amnesty was granted to suspended university employees, allowing even former Nazis to continue their careers at the University of Graz without difficulty. Professors who had been expelled before the war, on the other hand, were not asked to return to their old positions.

=== Second Republic (from 1955) ===
The upheaval among professors caused by World War II meant that in the early years of the Second Republic, many comparatively young professors came to the University of Graz, some of whom remained there until the 1980s, leading to a noticeable generational problem at the university during the period of upheaval in the 1970s.

By 1975, the University of Graz had reestablished itself in its traditional organizational structure, which had remained virtually unchanged since 1848. It was not until the sharp increase in student numbers in the 1970s that a fundamental reform of teaching became necessary, which has since been largely supported by the mid-level faculty. The University Organization Act of 1975, which aimed to overcome stagnation at universities, also led to profound changes at the University of Graz, particularly with regard to the composition of committees. Since then, representatives of the non-professorial academic staff, students, and general staff have also been represented in the Senate of the University of Graz. Another consequence of the law was the separation of the Faculty of Natural Sciences from the Faculty of Philosophy and the division of the social sciences and law into two separate faculties. In 1993, the University Organization Act was further amended, which resulted in greater autonomy and transferred budgetary responsibility to the universities.

In 2002, the UG2002 led to significant changes at the University of Graz. In addition to adapting degrees in line with the Bologna Process, the law also provided for the establishment of separate medical universities. As a result, the medical faculty became an independent university with its main location on the grounds of the state hospital in Graz. In addition, the organizational structure of the universities was comprehensively reformed. In addition to the Rectorate and Senate, the University Council was established, which is composed of equal numbers of representatives from the university and the federal government and is comparable to a supervisory board. In addition, the university buildings were transferred to the ownership of the Federal Real Estate Company (BIG), which leases them to the universities.

The University Act of 2002 formed the basis for the implementation of the Bologna Process, under which studies were gradually converted from diploma programs to the bachelor's-master's system. By 2024, only two four-year-diploma programs were still available for enrollment: Catholic Theology and Law.

Another turning point came in 2005, when the European Court of Justice ruled that Austrian universities were not allowed to apply the numerus clausus for German high school graduates, as there is no comparable provision for students from Austria. The University of Graz was therefore forced to impose admission restrictions in the form of entrance exams for several oversubscribed courses. 75 percent of study places are reserved for people with an Austrian high school diploma.

In 2007, the sixth faculty was established at the University of Graz: the Faculty of Environmental, Regional and Educational Sciences (URBI). This faculty combines educational sciences with the subjects of environmental systems sciences, geography, and sports. The Wegener Center for Climate and Global Change, founded in 2005, was incorporated into the URBI faculty as an institute in 2013.

In the fall of 2022, the University of Graz began construction of its own building at the Sermilik Research Station in Greenland. The station will be available to polar researchers from spring 2024.

Demolition of the so-called pre-clinical building began in fall 2023. The Graz Center of Physics is to be built on the site by 2030, which will house the physics institutes of the University of Graz and the Graz University of Technology.

=== Culture of Remembrance ===
After the end of World War II, the Nazi era was long suppressed at the University of Graz. This was due to the deep roots of the NSDAP among the student body and professors prior to the Anschluss. The denazification process carried out in the late 1940s brought little change, which prevented an effective reappraisal of the years under Nazi dictatorship. Instead, attempts were made to hide everything that reminded people of this period. One example of this is the fresco by Franz Köck in the student union building, the long-time home of the ÖH. It was commissioned in honor of the National Socialist students and hastily painted over after the end of the war. The portrait of Rector Karl Polheim (1939 to 1945) was also removed from the auditorium.

It was not until the 1960s and 1970s that isolated attempts were made to take a more critical look at the role of the University of Graz during the Nazi dictatorship. Nevertheless, university honors continued to be awarded to individuals with Nazi ties without reflection. A symbol of this conflict was the celebration of Otto Loewis's 100th birthday in 1973. Although the University of Graz was happy to identify with the achievements of the Nobel Prize winner, his expulsion was only briefly mentioned.

The 50th anniversaries of the National Socialists' seizure of power in Germany in 1933 and the annexation of Austria in 1938 led to a renewed examination of their own role during the dictatorship at almost all German-speaking universities in the 1980s. In 1984, the so-called "memorial plaque affair" took place in Graz, which marked a turning point for the University of Graz. As part of the university's 400th anniversary celebrations, the umbrella organization of German nationalist student fraternities had a memorial plaque installed in front of the auditorium to commemorate the victims of "political arbitrariness" between 1934 and 1955. The plaque was unveiled on the national holiday. This sparked fierce protests, directed both against the revisionist plaque itself and against the exploitation of the university's anniversary by German nationalist fraternities.

The protests were widely reported in the Austrian media and even caused a stir in federal politics. Numerous organizations demanded that the plaque be removed, including members of the Faculty of Humanities and the ÖH, which covered the plaque in November 1984 in a media-effective manner. The widespread criticism of the university's own attempts to come to terms with its past was a novelty for the University of Graz. At the end of November, the Senate decided to publicly distance itself from the text of the inscription and to revise it to include all victims of war and dictatorship in its historical context. The plaque is still located in the university's auditorium today.

The process of coming to terms with Austria's Nazi past began in 1988, 50 years after the Anschluss. In addition to addressing the content, the university also engaged in an artistic examination of the period in the context of several exhibitions. When Franz Köck's Nazi frescoes reappeared during renovation work in 1977, the University of Graz felt compelled to address this chapter of its own history. Instead of painting over the frescoes, it was decided to preserve them as a memorial and break them down artistically. The headings were written by historian Helmut Konrad and artist Richard Kriesche on a Plexiglas panel in front of the fresco.

Since then, the University of Graz has been committed to critically examining its own Nazi past. In 2000, the Center for Jewish Studies was founded. Between 2008 and 2017, 127 books that had been stolen during the Nazi regime were returned to their rightful owners in the university library. The University of Graz website commemorates the expelled and murdered members of the university from this period. In 1998, the university established an independent Historians' Commission (Historikerkommission) to systematically research its entanglement with the National Socialist regime. The commission's findings were subsequently used as a basis for restitution efforts, including the return of looted library materials and the public commemoration of expelled scholars. In November 2023, stumbling stones were installed on the campus of the University of Graz and the Medical University of Graz in memory of the victims.

=== The Graz School of psychology ===
At the turn of the 20th century, the university was the center of the Graz School of psychology and philosophy, founded by Alexius Meinong and Christian von Ehrenfels. This school developed object theory (Gegenstandstheorie), which posited that objects of thought can possess properties even if they do not exist in reality (e.g., the "round square"). This framework influenced the later development of Gestalt psychology and modern phenomenology.

== Faculties and Institutions ==
The University of Graz is divided into six faculties with 71 institutes and 45 centers:

- Catholic Theology Faculty
- Faculty of Law
- Social and Economic Sciences Faculty
- Humanities Faculty
- Natural Sciences Faculty
- Environmental, Regional, and Educational Sciences Faculty

The Faculty of Medicine was spun off into a separate university in 2003 by the University Act 2002, with effect from 1 January 2004: Medical University of Graz. Until the completion of the new medical campus on the grounds of the LKH Graz, the Medical University of Graz continued to use the building of the former pre-clinical center on the grounds of the University of Graz. After the Medical University moved out, the building was demolished to make way for the Graz Center of Physics, which is scheduled for completion in 2030.

Since Graz was the capital of the then multiethnic Duchy of Styria, Slovenes from Lower Styria came there to study. It has served as a gateway to South-East Europe for Austrian scholars, scientists and businesses. The establishment of the Department for Slovene Language and Literature at the University of Graz, for example, laid the foundation for scholarly studies of Slovenian culture, literature, and language bundled in the so-called Slovene studies.

== Studies ==
=== Regular studies ===
Within the framework of regular full-time studies, the University of Graz offers degrees at bachelor's, master's, and PhD levels. In two diploma programs at the faculties of law and Catholic theology, the title "Magister/Magistra" can also be obtained.

- Bachelor's program in German: 37 subjects
- Bachelor's program in English: 1 subject
- Master's program in German: 67 subjects
- Master's program in English: 24 subjects
- Master's program in Slovenian: 1 subject
- Diploma program in German: 2 subjects
- Teaching degree Bachelor's/Master's: 24 subjects
- PhD in German: 11 subjects
- PhD in English: 7 subjects

Admission to bachelor's programs in biology, molecular biology, pharmaceutical sciences, psychology, sports and exercise sciences, teaching, as well as the diploma program in law and the master's programs in psychology and pharmacy requires successful completion of an admission procedure.

=== Extraordinary studies ===
Through its subsidiary "Uni4Life," the University of Graz also offers a comprehensive continuing education program in the form of courses and extraordinary studies in the fields of economics, law, education & social affairs, language & communication, and health & natural sciences.

- Extraordinary bachelor's program: 1 subject
- Extraordinary master's program: 9 subjects
- University courses: 9 subjects
- University courses: 21 subjects

== Science ==
University rankings

Global – Overall
- ARWU World: 401-500 (2026)
- QS World: =696 (2027)
- THE World: 501–550 (2027)
- USNWR Global: =682 (2026)

The University of Graz sees itself as a university for the natural sciences, humanities, social sciences, and economics. To live up to this claim, it has defined several subject areas in which it is intensifying its research. Here, scientists from different disciplines work together in an interdisciplinary manner.

=== Profile areas ===
==== Climate Change ====
The focus of research here is, on the one hand, on gaining a better understanding of the uncertainties, risks, and opportunities associated with climate change, particularly with regard to tipping points, which, if exceeded, threaten the continued existence of various systems. On the other hand, possible strategies for a transition to a virtually emission-free and climate-resilient economy and society are being investigated.

==== Complexity of Life in Basic Research and Innovation (COLIBRI) ====
COLIBRI deals with changes that are coming to our living environment. Understanding complex systems (through modeling and computer simulations) should provide science, business, and politics with the basis for decisions in the interests of sustainability.

==== Dimensions of Europe ====
The Dimensions of Europe profile area examines how developments and objectives of an urban center are transferred to other, peripheral regions and what effects this has there, as well as the countervailing effects of the periphery on the center. These topics also imply a critical reflection on the terms ‘center’ and ‘periphery’ as well as the further development of theoretical concepts and empirical methods for representing and analyzing social transformation processes. In doing so, the profile area builds on the University of Graz's historically grown focus on Southeast Europe.

==== Smart Regulation ====
Smart regulation is the innovative, efficient, and adaptable control of the behavior and interaction of individuals, society, and companies with the aim of enabling socially, economically, and ecologically responsible decisions. Research focuses on questions arising in relation to both existing and future models of regulation, behavioral control, and the creation of incentives to guide the decisions of individuals, companies, and society.

==== BioHealth ====
A long and healthy life depends on many factors. That is why researchers in the BioHealth profile area are working on solutions to various questions that are essential to this. The focus is on researching the performance of cells or the role of immune cells in the progression of diseases. Another field of research concerns the balance of fat metabolism. Significant progress has also been made in the research of active substances against resistant bacteria or pathogenic fungi.

=== Research Networks ===
==== The Human Factor in Digital Transformation ====
The HFDT research network brings together research perspectives from the fields of digital humanities, business analytics, economics, education, philosophy, psychology, law, sociology, systems science, theology, and business informatics. It addresses key topics of digital transformation in the field of teaching on the one hand and in various projects with different compositions on the other.

==== Heterogeneity and Cohesion ====
The research network focuses on the question of how social cohesion is shaped against the backdrop of increasing social diversity. The problem of social cohesion is becoming particularly acute due to the ongoing fragmentation and individualization of living conditions. On the one hand, it is important to describe and research the diversity of societies in all its facets in detail.

==== Brain and Behavior ====
The research fields combine research activities in the fields of brain and behavior. In the area of competence, research focuses on topics such as the measurement of differences in competence and the fundamentals of cognitive abilities. The second research area investigates how health is related to the acquisition or implementation of specific cognitive and emotional competencies.

==== Environment and Global Change (EGC Graz) ====
The focus is on researching and monitoring climate and environmental change and its effects, analyzing the role of humans, and identifying ways to achieve sustainable regional development and innovation. The primary focus region is Austria, embedded in European and globally oriented research and general basic research on environmental systems.

== Partnerships and Collaborations ==
The University of Graz works closely with the University of Leipzig, the University of Ljubljana, Montclair State University, the University of Waterloo, and Nanjing University.

In addition to these direct agreements, the University of Graz is also an active member of several internationally established networks. These serve to promote the internationalization of the university and enable the exchange of staff and students.

- Alpen-Adria Rectors' Conference
- Arqus – European University Alliance
- ASEA Uninet
- CEEPUS
- CEI – Central European Initiative
- Coimbra Group
- Danube Rector's Conference (DRC)
- Eurasia-Pacific UNINET
- ISEP
- Utrecht Network

In cooperation with the Austrian Academy of Sciences, the University of Graz is represented in several research institutions in Graz.

- Cori Institute
- Institute for Space Research

Together with UNESCO, the University of Graz operates the

- European Training and Research Center for Human Rights and Democracy.

In 2011, the University of Graz, the Medical University of Graz, and Graz University of Technology launched BioTechMed-Graz, an initiative for cooperation and networking in the fields of biomedical fundamentals, technological developments, and medical applications.

Since 2004, there has been a strategic cooperation between the Graz University of Technology and NAWI Graz, within the framework of which large parts of the Faculty of Natural Sciences collaborate with the respective related departments at the University of Technology in research and teaching. In the winter semester of 2006/2007, the first joint studies in the fields of chemistry, molecular biology, and earth sciences were launched. All bachelor's and master's programs in molecular biology, chemistry, earth sciences, USW NAWI TECH, mathematics, and physics are now offered in cooperation.

The university is a member of the Alliance of Sustainable Universities, founded in 2012 with the aim of promoting sustainability at universities.

== Campus ==
The foundation stone for today's university campus was laid in 1871. Construction lasted until 1895. Although there were repeated efforts to expand the campus and land was purchased, it took more than 70 years for the next expansion of the site to take place. In 1967, the decision was made to build the university sports center on Rosenhein (completed in 1984) and the so-called pre-clinical center. The brutalist high-rise was handed over for its intended purpose in 1977. After the founding of the Medical University of Graz, it was used by the university until the new university buildings adjacent to the LKH Graz were completed. In 2023, it was demolished to make way for the Graz Center of Physics.

A central part of the campus is the ReSoWi building located to the east. Completed in 1994, the complex houses the faculties of law and social sciences. The University Center for Theology (UZT), completed in 2007, which houses all the institutes of the Catholic Faculty of Theology, is located within walking distance east of the ReSoWi. The Center for Molecular Biosciences was opened in the north of the campus in 2007. With the exception of the Wall Center (around 1.1 kilometers to the south), all institutes and faculties are within easy walking distance.

Today, the University of Graz campus, with a total area of more than 130,000 square meters, is one of the largest green spaces in the center of Graz. The university's botanical garden covers an area of around 2.8 hectares (greenhouse area: 1500 m²) and is home to around 7500 plant species.

=== Transport ===
Bus lines 31, 41, 58, and 63 of the Grazer Linien stop directly adjacent to the University of Graz campus. Stops for tram lines 1 and 7 are about a five-minute walk away. The campus is connected to the city of Graz's network of bike paths. Coming from the city park, you can ride directly to the main building via the bike path on Zinzendorfgasse.

=== Student residences ===
There are several student residences in the vicinity of the university campus. These include the "Friedrich Schiller Heim," the "Elisabethheim," the "Liebigheim," "UNIBLICK," and many more. In addition, there are numerous providers of shared apartments for students in the residential buildings around the campus.

=== Gastronomy ===
There is a wide range of dining options around the university. Zinzendorfgasse is lined with restaurants, and there are several bakeries scattered around the university. Heinreichstraße has numerous takeaways. There are several cafes, food trucks, and a cafeteria right on campus. Not far from the university on Elisabethstraße, there are several evening venues that are open late into the night on weekends.

=== Company branches around the campus ===
The student Association operates the "ÖH Center" on Schubertstraße, where students can buy lecture notes or place print orders. Branches of the Raiffeisenbank and the Steiermärkische Sparkasse are located on Zinsendorfgasse. The supermarket chain Spar has a branch in the meeting zone at the end of Zinzendorfgasse.

=== Sports ===
North of the campus is the UNI Rosenhain Sports Center with five halls, including an indoor running track and a large outdoor area with three tennis courts, two beach volleyball courts, an athletics track, a hard court, and a soccer field. Students can attend numerous USI courses here.

=== Wall ===
About one kilometer south of the campus is the Wall Library Center, which houses the specialist libraries for Romance studies, Slavic studies, education, and translation studies, as well as the Institute Library for Linguistics.

=== Off-campus ===
The University of Graz also operates two research sites away from the university. At the summit of the Gerlitze in Carinthia is the Kanzelhöhe Solar Observatory. Researchers from the University of Graz use four telescopes to observe the sun and document its changes. Several thousand kilometers to the northeast is the Sermilik Research Station in East Greenland, which is operated by the University of Graz and the University of Copenhagen. A new building was constructed here in 2023, which can accommodate up to 25 scientists and can be used all year round.

== Regional and economic impact ==
The University of Graz is one of the largest employers in the state of Styria. The institution facilitates technology transfer and the creation of academic spin-offs, which are cited as contributing factors to the city of Graz's official designation as a "City of Science" (Wissenschaftsstadt).

== Organisation ==
Since the University Act of 2002, the management of universities has been divided among three bodies: the university council, the senate, and the rectorate.

=== University Council ===
The tasks of the university council include: Electing the rector from a list of three candidates proposed by the senate. Concluding target agreements with the rectorate. Approving the development plan, the organizational plan, and the draft performance agreement.

=== Rectorate ===
The Rectorate is responsible for the operational management of the university and represents it externally.

=== Senate ===
As the central collegial body, the Senate issues the university's statutes and is involved in the preparation and approval of the development and organization plan. The Senate of the University of Graz consists of 28 members. Fourteen are appointed by the professors, seven by the mid-level faculty, six by the students, and one by the general staff.

=== Student representation ===
The Student Union at the University of Graz (ÖH Uni Graz for short) is the legal representative of all university students at the University of Graz. It is a student-run public corporation. Every two years, the student representatives are re-elected by the students in the ÖH elections.

== Nobel prize laureates ==
- Walther Nernst, 1920 in chemistry – studied in Graz in 1886
- Fritz Pregl, 1923 in chemistry – in Graz 1913 to 1930
- Julius Wagner von Jauregg, 1927 in medicine – in Graz 1889 to 1893
- Erwin Schrödinger, 1933 in physics – in Graz 1936 to 1938
- Otto Loewi, 1936 in medicine – in Graz 1909 to 1938
- Victor Franz Hess, 1936 in physics – studied in Graz 1893–1906 and taught 1919 to 1931 as well as 1937 to 1938
- Gerty Cori, 1947 in medicine – in Graz before 1922
- Ivo Andrić, 1961 in literature – received his doctorate in Graz in 1924
- Karl von Frisch, 1973 in medicine – in Graz 1946 to 1950
- Peter Handke, 2019 in literature – studied in Graz 1961–1965

== Notable faculty ==
- Hermann Beitzke, pathologist, professor at Graz (1922–1941)
- Leopold Biwald, professor of Physics, late 18th century
- Ludwig Boltzmann, professor of Mathematical Physics (1869–1873) and Physics (1876–1890)
- Ludwig Gumplowicz, taught administration (1897–1909)
- Rudolf von Jaksch, taught pediatrics (1887–1899)
- Ernst Mach, taught mathematics and physics (1864–67)
- Ernst Mally, philosopher, founder of Deontic logic (1925–1942)
- Alexius Meinong (1853–1920), philosopher, founder of the Graz School of phenomenological psychology after 1894
- Gustav Meyer, linguist and considered to be one of the founders of Albanology, as a discipline of study, professor since 1881
- Rudolf von Scherer, religious law professor (1875–1899)
- Ludwig Karl Schmarda, founder of the school's Zoological Museum (circa 1851)
- Roland Scholl, chemist, professor at the university for some time between 1907 and 1914
- Joseph Schumpeter, economist, later teaching at Harvard University, in Graz (1912–1914)
- Anton Wassmuth, professor of theoretical physics (1893–1914)
- Alfred Wegener, father of the continental drift theory, professor of Geophysics (1924–1930)
- Gustava Aigner (1906–1987), Austrian geologist and palaeontologist

== Notable alumni ==
- Ivo Andrić, Yugoslav writer and Nobel Prize laureate
- Lasgush Poradeci, Albanian philologist, poet and writer
- Gabriel Anton, Austrian neurologist and psychiatrist
- Count Anton Alexander von Auersperg, Austrian poet and politician
- Milko Brezigar, Yugoslav economist
- Safet Butka, Albanian politician
- Izidor Cankar, Slovenian art historian and Yugoslav diplomat
- Etbin Henrik Costa, Slovenian politician
- Katharina Dobler, Austrian folklorist
- Hellmut Fischmeister, Austrian chemist
- Monika Fludernik, Austrian literary scholar
- Karl Gurakuqi, Albanian linguist and folklorist
- Juraj Habdelić, Croatian writer
- Emil Johann Lambert Heinricher, Austrian botanist
- Archbishop Ieronymos II of Athens, Archbishop of Athens
- Ernst Kaltenbrunner, Austrian-born senior SS official of Nazi Germany, executed for war crimes
- Janko Kersnik, Slovenian writer
- Ferdinand Konščak, Croatian Jesuit missionary and cartographer
- Karel Lavrič, Slovenian politician
- Leo Leixner, war correspondent
- Franz Miklosich, Austrian-Slovenian linguist
- Heinz Oberhummer, Austrian physicist
- İbrahim Saraçoğlu, Turkish biochemist
- Vladimir Šubic, Slovenian architect
- Lovro Toman, Slovenian politician
- Petina Gappah, author and International lawyer
- Franz Unger, Austrian paleontologist
- Leopold von Sacher-Masoch, Austro-Ukrainian journalist and writer of Masochism
- Gregory Weeks, jurist and historian
- Milan Zver, Slovenian sociologist and politician
- Heinrich Harrer, Austrian mountaineer, sportsman, geographer, and author.

== Criticism ==
At the beginning of 2017, a dispute arose in the course of the appointment process for the Chair of Contemporary History following the retirement of Helmut Konrad. The expert Pieter M. Judson stated that the most competent applicants had not been considered and ultimately resigned in protest. Criticism was levelled at the fact that only German and Swiss applicants, but no Austrians, had been shortlisted. Various media outlets reported on the incident. As a result, the then rector Christa Neuper responded to the allegations and discontinued the appointment procedure. In 2020, after a new call for applications, the position was finally filled by Christiane Berth.

== See also ==
- University of Graz Library
- List of colleges and universities
- List of early modern universities in Europe
- Utrecht Network
- Gernot M. R. Winkler

== Further studies ==
- Höflechner, Walter; Wagner, Ingrid Maria (2006). Geschichte der Karl-Franzens-Universität Graz: von den Anfängen bis in das Jahr 2005 (in German). Grazer Universitätsverlag. ISBN 3-7011-0058-6.
- Clary, David C. (2022). Schrödinger in Oxford. World Scientific Publishing. ISBN 9789811251009.
