= Spin Nernst Effect =

The spin Nernst effect is a phenomenon of spin current generation caused by the thermal flow of electrons or magnons in condensed matter. Under a thermal drive such as temperature gradient or chemical potential gradient, spin-up and spin-down carriers can flow perpendicularly to the thermal current and towards opposite directions without the application of a magnetic field. This effect is similar to the spin Hall effect, where a pure spin current is induced by an electrical current. The spin Nernst effect can be detected by the spatial separation of opposite spin species, typically in the form of spin polarization (imbalanced spin accumulation) on the transverse boundaries of a material.

The spin Nernst effect of electrons was first experimentally observed in 2016 and published by two independent groups in 2017.

The spin Nernst effect of magnons (quanta of spin wave excitations) was theoretically proposed in 2016 in collinear antiferromagnetic materials, but its experimental confirmation remains elusive. In 2017, around the same time when its electronic counterpart was experimentally observed, the spin Nernst effect of magnons was first claimed in transition metal trichalcogenide MnPS_{3}. However, the experiment involved ambiguities that cannot convincingly verify the spin Nernst effect of magnons, awaiting further experimental studies. With a more accurate description accounting for real device geometry, it was believed that optical detection should be more reliable than electronic detection. At present, optical detection of the spin Nernst effect of magnons has not been reported.

== See also ==
- Spin Hall effect
- Nernst effect
