= Nernst effect =

Thermoelectric effect

In physics and chemistry, the Nernst effect (also termed the first Nernst–Ettingshausen effect, after Walther Nernst and Albert von Ettingshausen) is a thermoelectric (or thermomagnetic) phenomenon observed when a sample allowing electrical conduction is subjected to a magnetic field and a temperature gradient normal (perpendicular) to each other. An electric field will be induced normal to both.

This effect is quantified by the Nernst coefficient $\nu$, which is defined to be

$$\nu=\frac{E_y}{B_z}\frac{1}{\partial_x T}$$

where $E_y$ is the y-component of the electric field that results from the magnetic field's z-component $B_z$ and the x-component of the temperature gradient $\partial_x T$.

The reverse process is known as the Ettingshausen effect and also as the second Nernst–Ettingshausen effect.

== Physical picture ==
Mobile energy carriers (for example conduction-band electrons in a semiconductor) will move along temperature gradients due to statistics and the relationship between temperature and kinetic energy. If there is a magnetic field transversal to the temperature gradient and the carriers are electrically charged, they experience a force perpendicular to their direction of motion (also the direction of the temperature gradient) and to the magnetic field. Thus, a perpendicular electric field is induced.

== Sample types ==
The semiconductors exhibit the Nernst effect, as first observed by T. V. Krylova and Mochan in the Soviet Union in 1955. In metals however, it is almost non-existent.

=== Superconductors ===
Nernst effect appears in the vortex phase of type-II superconductors due to vortex motion. High-temperature superconductors exhibit the Nernst effect both in the superconducting and in the pseudogap phase. Heavy fermion superconductors can show a strong Nernst signal which is likely not due to the vortices.

== See also ==
- Spin Nernst effect
- Seebeck effect
- Peltier effect
- Hall effect
- Righi–Leduc effect
