= Ettingshausen effect =

The Ettingshausen effect (also known as second Nernst–Ettingshausen effect) is a thermoelectric (or thermomagnetic) phenomenon that affects the electric current in a conductor when a magnetic field is present.

Albert von Ettingshausen and his PhD student Walther Nernst were studying the Hall effect in bismuth, and noticed an unexpected perpendicular current flow when one side of the sample was heated. This is known as the Nernst effect. Conversely, when applying a current (along the y-axis) and a perpendicular magnetic field (along the z-axis) a temperature gradient appears along the x-axis. This is known as the Ettingshausen effect. Because of the Hall effect, electrons are forced to move perpendicular to the applied current. Due to the accumulation of electrons on one side of the sample, the number of collisions increases and a heating of the material occurs. This effect is quantified by the Ettingshausen coefficient P, which is defined as:

$$P=\frac{1}{|B_z| J_y}\frac{\mathrm{d}T}{\mathrm{d}x}$$

where dT/dx is the temperature gradient that results from the y-component J_{y} of an electric current density (in A/m^{2}) and the z-component B_{z} of a magnetic field.

temperature gradient due to Ettingshausen effect with applied magnetic field and electric current

In most metals like copper, silver and gold P is on the order of 10^{−16} m·K/(T·A) and thus difficult to observe in common magnetic fields. In bismuth the Ettingshausen coefficient is several orders of magnitude larger because of its poor thermal conductivity, (7.5±0.3)×10^{−4} m·K/(T·A).

== See also ==
- Hall effect
