= Spin Hall effect =

Transport phenomenon in physics

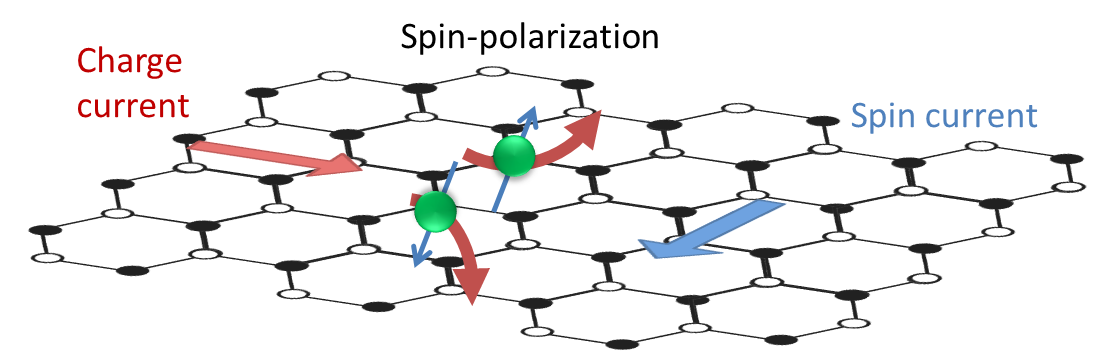
Schematic of the spin Hall effect

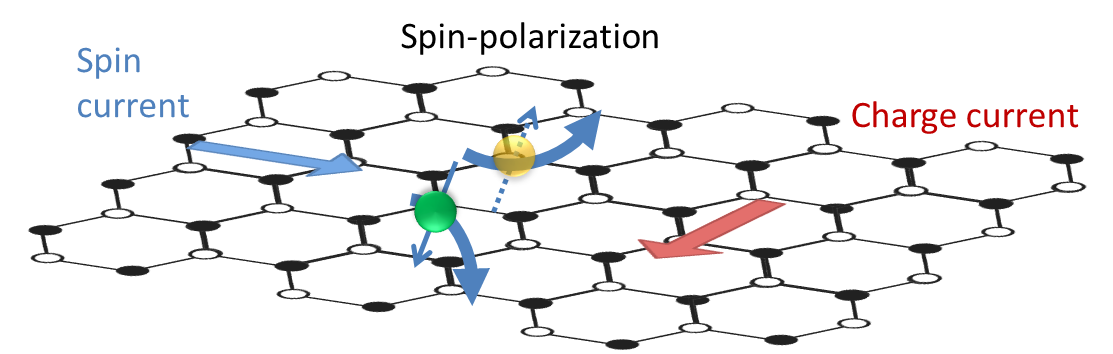
Schematic of the inverse spin Hall effect

The spin Hall effect (SHE) is a transport phenomenon predicted by Russian physicists Mikhail I. Dyakonov and Vladimir I. Perel in 1971. It consists of the appearance of spin accumulation on the lateral surfaces of an electric current-carrying sample, the signs of the spin directions being opposite on the opposing boundaries. In a cylindrical wire, the current-induced surface spins will wind around the wire. When the current direction is reversed, the directions of spin orientation is also reversed.

== Definition ==
The spin Hall effect is a transport phenomenon consisting of the appearance of spin accumulation on the lateral surfaces of a sample carrying electric current. The opposing surface boundaries will have spins of opposite sign. It is analogous to the classical Hall effect, where charges of opposite sign appear on the opposing lateral surfaces in an electric-current carrying sample in a magnetic field. In the case of the classical Hall effect the charge build up at the boundaries is in compensation for the Lorentz force acting on the charge carriers in the sample due to the magnetic field. No magnetic field is needed for the spin Hall effect which is a purely spin-based phenomenon. The spin Hall effect belongs to the same family as the anomalous Hall effect, known for a long time in ferromagnets, which also originates from spin–orbit interaction.

== History ==
The spin Hall effect (direct and inverse) was predicted by Russian physicists Mikhail I. Dyakonov and Vladimir I. Perel in 1971. They also introduced for the first time the notion of spin current.

In 1983 Nikita Averkiev and Dyakonov proposed a way to measure the inverse spin Hall effect under optical spin orientation in semiconductors. The first experimental demonstration of the inverse spin Hall effect, based on this idea, was performed by Bakun et al. in 1984.

The term "spin Hall effect" was introduced by Hirsch who re-predicted this effect in 1999.

Experimentally, the (direct) spin Hall effect was observed in semiconductors more than 30 years after the original prediction.

== Physical origin ==
Two possible mechanisms give origin to the spin Hall effect, in which an electric current (composed of moving charges) transforms into a spin current (a current of moving spins without charge flow). The original (extrinsic) mechanism devised by Dyakonov and Perel consisted of spin-dependent Mott scattering, where carriers with opposite spin diffuse in opposite directions when colliding with impurities in the material. The second mechanism is due to intrinsic properties of the material, where the carrier's trajectories are distorted due to spin–orbit interaction as a consequence of the asymmetries in the material.

One can intuitively picture the intrinsic effect by using the classical analogy between an electron and a spinning tennis ball. The tennis ball deviates from its straight path in air in a direction depending on the sense of rotation, also known as the Magnus effect. In a solid, the air is replaced by an effective electric field due to asymmetries in the material, the relative motion between the magnetic moment (associated to the spin) and the electric field creates a coupling that distorts the motion of the electrons.

Similar to the standard Hall effect, both the extrinsic and the intrinsic mechanisms lead to an accumulation of spins of opposite signs on opposing lateral boundaries.

== Mathematical description ==
The spin current is described by a second-rank tensor q_{ij}, where the first index refers to the direction of flow, and the second one to the spin component that is flowing. Thus q_{xy} denotes the flow density of the y-component of spin in the x-direction. Introduce also the vector q_{i} of charge flow density (which is related to the normal current density j=eq), where e is the elementary charge. The coupling between spin and charge currents is due to spin-orbit interaction. It may be described in a very simple way by introducing a single dimensionless coupling parameter ʏ.

The phenomenological equations describing the spin Hall effect and the inverse spin Hall effect were first derived by Dyakonov and Perel in Refs. In Refs., a quantum theory of electron spin transport was constructed, suitable for describing effects that arise due to spin-orbit scattering of conduction electrons on defects of the crystal lattice. The theory constructed in can be used in studying the anomalous Hall effect, the external spin Hall effect, and the inverse external spin Hall effect.

== Spin Hall magnetoresistance ==
No magnetic field is needed for spin Hall effect. However, if a strong enough magnetic field is applied in the direction perpendicular to the orientation of the spins at the surfaces, spins will precess around the direction of the magnetic field and the spin Hall effect will disappear. Thus in the presence of magnetic field, the combined action of the direct and inverse spin Hall effect leads to a change of the sample resistance, an effect that is of second order in spin-orbit interaction. This was noted by Dyakonov and Perel already in 1971 and later elaborated in more detail by Dyakonov. In recent years, the spin Hall magnetoresistance was extensively studied experimentally both in magnetic and non-magnetic materials (heavy metals, such as Pt, Ta, Pd, where the spin-orbit interaction is strong).

== Swapping spin currents ==
A transformation of spin currents consisting in interchanging (swapping) of the spin and flow directions (q_{ij} → q_{ji}) was predicted by Lifshits and Dyakonov. Thus a flow in the x-direction of spins polarized along y is transformed to a flow in the y-direction of spins polarized along x. This prediction has yet not been confirmed experimentally.

== Optical monitoring ==
The direct and inverse spin Hall effect can be monitored by optical means. The spin accumulation induces circular polarization of the emitted light, as well as the Faraday (or Kerr) polarization rotation of the transmitted (or reflected) light. Observing the polarization of emitted light allows the spin Hall effect to be observed.

More recently, the existence of both direct and inverse effects was demonstrated not only in semiconductors, but also in metals.

== Applications ==
The spin Hall effect can be used to manipulate electron spins electrically. For example, in combination with the electric stirring effect, the spin Hall effect leads to spin polarization in a localized conducting region.

== See also ==
- Quantum spin Hall effect
- Spin Nernst effect
