= Albert von Ettingshausen =

Austrian physicist (1850–1932)

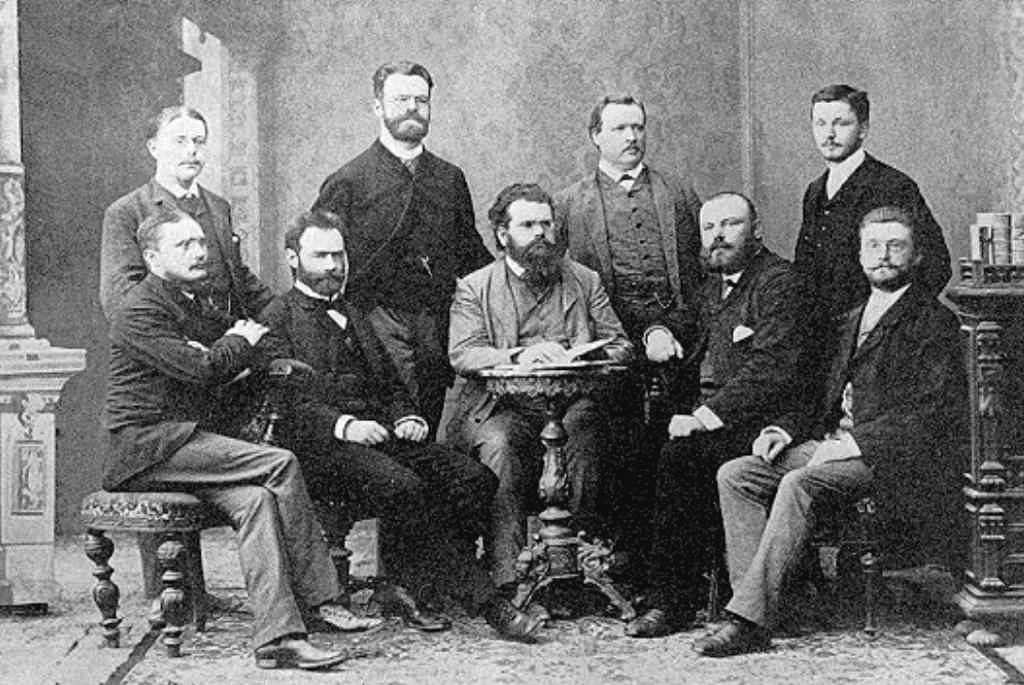
- Albert von Ettingshausen (sitting, second from left)
- Born: 30 March 1850; Vienna, Austria
- Died: 9 June 1932 (aged 82); Graz, Austria
- Known for: Ettingshausen effect Nernst–Ettingshausen effect

Albert von Ettingshausen (30 March 1850 – 9 June 1932) was an Austrian physicist. He was professor of physics at Graz University of Technology, where he also taught electrical engineering. Earlier he was an assistant to Ludwig Boltzmann at the University of Graz.

In 1886, he and his colleague Walther Nernst, then a PhD student at the University of Graz, jointly discovered the thermoelectric phenomena now known as the Ettingshausen effect and Nernst effect.

== Biography ==
Albert Konstantin Karl Josef von Ettingshausen was born in Vienna as first of two children to Karl von Ettingshausen and Friederike Ettingshausen, née Kaltschmied. In 1854 the family moved to Graz. Albert’s sister Anna was born on 11 February 1856. Albert’s uncle was the mathematician and physicist Andreas von Ettingshausen, his cousin the botanist Constantin von Ettingshausen

Albert von Ettingshausen studied physics and mathematics at the University of Graz. Still a student, he became an assistant professor for physics. From 1878 to 1888 he worked as associate professor at the University of Graz side by side with Ludwig Boltzmann. In 1888 he succeeded professor Jakob Pöschl, who held the chair of theoretical and experimental physics and was teacher of Nikola Tesla, at Graz University of Technology. Albert von Ettingshausen married Pauline Nowakowsky (2.12.1865 – 8.8.1951) on 29 July 1893. Their only son Konstantin Roland Karl Albert was born on 18 September 1894. In 1920 Ettingshausen retired.

Since 1884, Albert von Ettingshausen was member of the German National Academy of Sciences Leopoldina. Ettingshausen was a knight 3rd class of the Order of the Iron Crown (Austria) and was elected two times rector of Graz University of Technology namely in 1893/94 and 1912/13. He served as dean several periods as well. He died aged 82 in the morning of 9 June 1932 of diabetes mellitus and arteriosclerosis.
