= Spinterface =

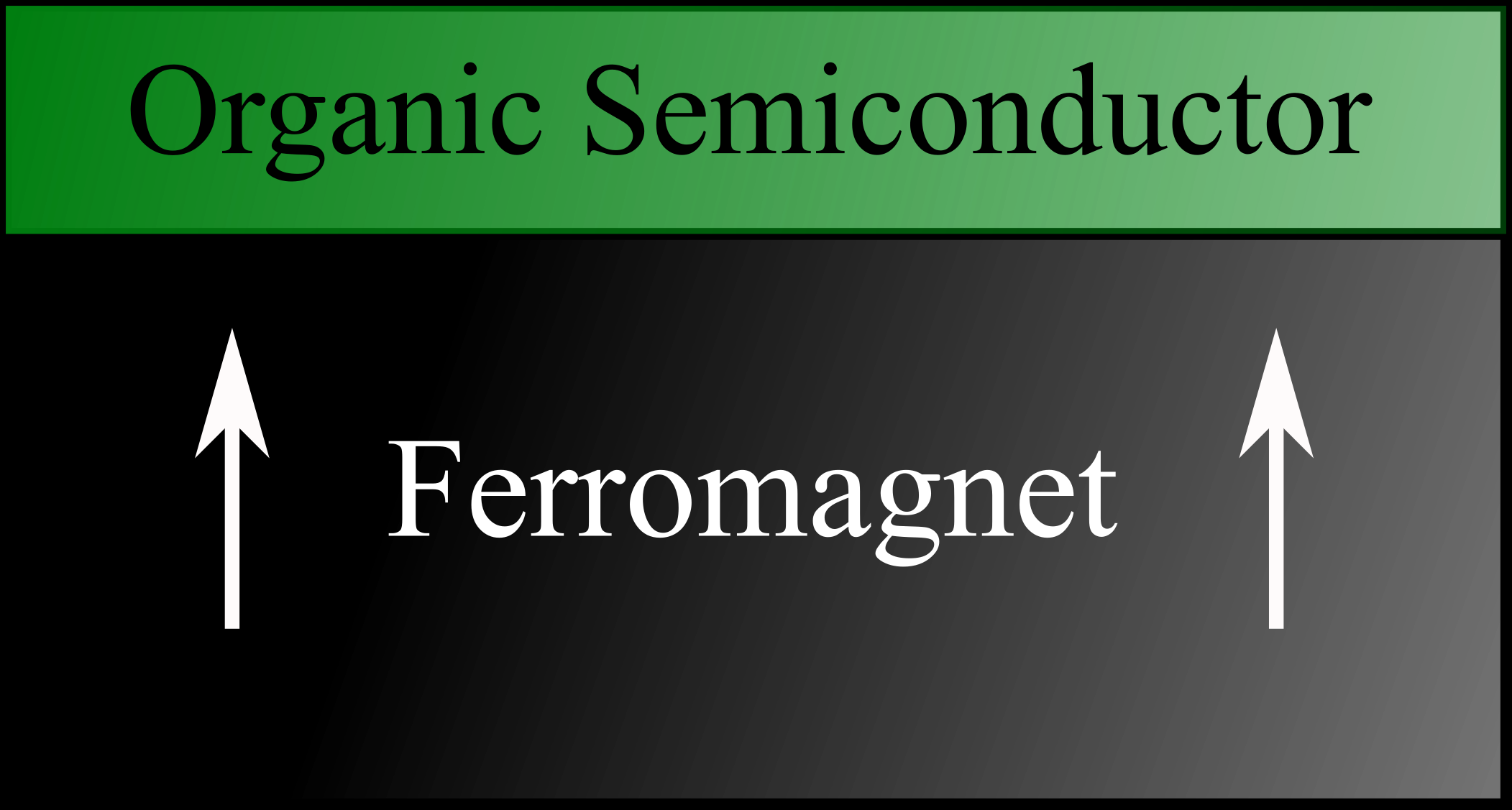
Spinterface: organic semiconductor layer grown on a ferromagnet substrate

Spinterface is a term coined to indicate an interface between a ferromagnet and an organic semiconductor. This is a widely investigated topic in molecular spintronics, since the role of interfaces plays a huge part in the functioning of a device. In particular, spinterfaces are widely studied in the scientific community because of their hybrid organic/inorganic composition. In fact, the hybridization between the metal and the organic material can be controlled by acting on the molecules, which are more responsive to electrical and optical stimuli than metals. This gives rise to the possibility of efficiently tuning the magnetic properties of the interface at the atomic scale.

== History ==
The field of spintronics, which is the scientific field that aims to study the spin-dependent electron transport in solid-state devices, emerged in the last decades of the 20th century, first with the observation of the injection of a spin-polarized current from a ferromagnetic to a paramagnetic metal and subsequently with the discovery of tunnel magnetoresistance and giant magnetoresistance. The field evolved turning towards spin-orbit related phenomena, such as Rashba effect. Only more recently, spintronics has been extended to the organic world, with the idea of exploiting the weak spin-relaxation mechanisms of molecules in order to use them for spin transport. Research in this field started off with hybrid replicas of inorganic spintronic devices, such as spin valves and magnetic tunneling junctions, trying to obtain spin transport in molecular films. However some devices didn't behave as expected, for example vertical spin valves displaying a negative magnetoresistance. It was then quickly understood that the molecular layers don't just play a transport role but they can also act on the spin polarization of the ferromagnet at the interface. Because of this, the interest on ferromagnet/organic interfaces rapidly increased in the scientific community and the term "spinterface" was born. The research is currently aimed at building devices with interfaces engineered in order to tailor the spin injection.

== Scientific interest ==
The shrinking of device sizes and the attention towards low power consumption applications has led to an ever-growing attention towards the physics of surfaces and interfaces, which play a fundamental role in the functioning of many applications. The breaking of the bulk symmetry which occurs at a surface leads to different physical and chemical properties, which are sometimes impossible to find in the bulk material. In particular, when a solid-state material is interfaced with another solid, the terminations of the two different materials influence each other by means of chemical bonds. The behavior of the interface is highly influenced by the properties of the materials. In particular, in spinterfaces, a metal and an organic semiconductor, which display very different electronic properties, are interfaced and they usually form a strong hybridization. With the final aim of being able to tune and change the electronic and magnetic behavior of the interface, spinterfaces are studied both by inserting them into spintronic devices and, on a more basic level, by investigating the growth of ultra-thin molecular layers on ferromagnetic substates with a surface science approach. The scope of building such interfaces is on one side to exploit the spin-polarized character of the electronic structure of the ferromagnet to induce a spin polarization in the molecular layer and, on the other hand, to influence the magnetic character of the ferromagnetic layer by means of hybridization. Combining this with the fact that usually molecules have a very high responsivity to stimuli (typically impossible to achieve in inorganic materials) there is the hope of being able to easily change the character of the hybridization, hence tuning the properties of the spinterface. This could give rise to a new class of spintronic devices, where the spinterface plays a fundamental and active role.

== Physics and applications ==
Organic semiconductors are currently used in various applications, for example OLED displays, which can be flexible, thinner, faster and more power efficient than LCD screens, and organic field-effect transistors, intended for large, low-cost electronic products and biodegradable electronics.

In terms of spintronic applications, there are no available commercial devices yet, but the applied research is headed towards the use of spinterfaces mainly for magnetic tunneling junctions and organic spin valves.

=== Spin-Filtering ===
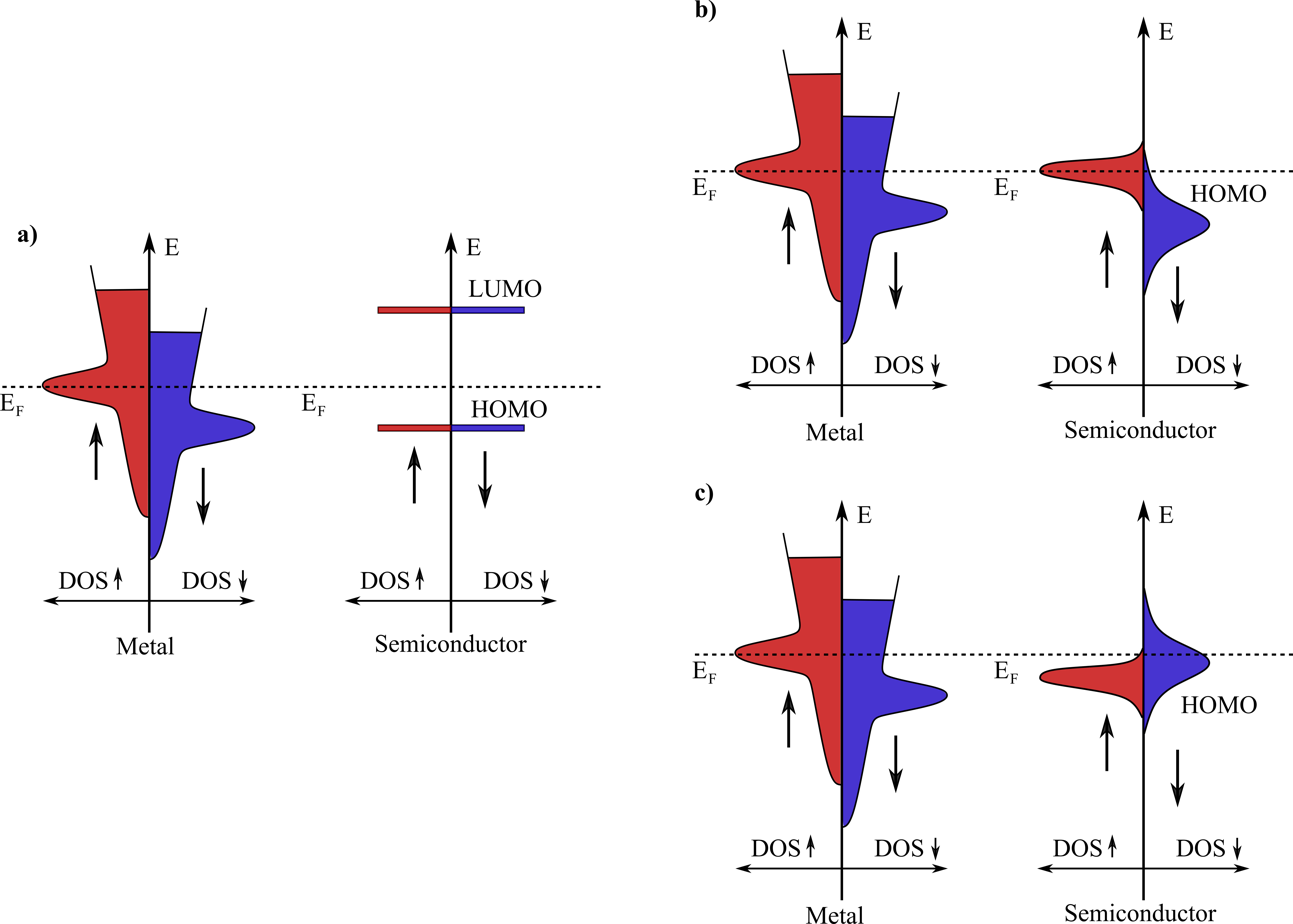
Spin-dependent hybridization in a spinterface

The physical principle that is mainly exploited when talking about spinterfaces is the spin-filtering. This is simply schematized in figure: when one considers the ferromagnet and the organic semiconductor on their own (panel a), the density of states (DOS) of the metal will be unbalanced between the two spin channels, with the difference of the up and down DOS at the Fermi level governing the spin polarization of the current flow; the DOS of the organic semiconductor will have no unbalance between the spin channels and will display localized energy levels, namely highest occupied molecular orbital (HOMO) and lowest unoccupied molecular orbital (LUMO), with zero DOS at the Fermi Level. When the two materials are put into contact they influence each other's DOS at the interface: the main effects are a broadening of the molecular orbitals and a possible shift of their energy. These effects are in general spin-dependent, since they arise from the hybridization, which is strictly dependent on the DOS of the two materials, which is itself spin-unbalanced in the case of the ferromagnet. As a matter of example, panel b represents the case of a parallel injection of current, while panel c schematizes an antiparallel spin polarization of the current injected in the semiconductor. In this way, the injected current will be polarized accordingly to the interface DOS at the Fermi Level and exploiting the fact that molecules usually have intrinsically weak spin-relaxation mechanisms, molecular layers are great candidates for spin transport applications. By a good material choice one is then able to filter the spins at the spinterface.

=== Magnetic Tunneling Junction ===
Applied research on spinterfaces is often focused on studying the tunnel magnetoresistance (TMR) in hybrid magnetic tunneling junctions (MTJs). Conventional MTJs are composed by two ferromagnetic electrodes separated by an insulating layer, thin enough for electron tunneling events to be relevant. The idea of using spinterfaces consists in replacing the inorganic insulating barrier with an organic one. The motivation for this is given by the flexibility, low cost and higher spin-relaxation times of molecules and the possibility of chemically engineering the interfaces. The physical principle behind MTJs is that the tunneling of the junction is dependent on the relative orientation of the magnetization of the ferromagnetic electrodes. In fact, in the Jullière model, the tunneling current that passes through the junction is proportional to the sum of the products of the DOS of the single spin channels:

Simplified picture of spin-dependent tunneling

$J^{p} \propto D^{\uparrow}_1 \cdot D^{\uparrow}_2+D^{\downarrow}_1 \cdot D^{\downarrow}_2 \qquad$ $\qquad J^{ap} \propto D^{\uparrow}_1 \cdot D^{\downarrow}_2+D^{\downarrow}_1 \cdot D^{\uparrow}_2$

The picture of spin-dependent tunneling is represented in figure, and what is observed is that usually there is a larger tunneling current in the case of parallel alignment of the electrode magnetizations. This is given by the fact that, in this case, the term $D^{\downarrow}_1 \cdot D^{\downarrow}_2$ will be way larger than all the other terms, making $J^{p} > J^{ap}$. By changing the relative orientation of the magnetization of the electrodes it is possible to control the conductance state of the tunneling junction and use this principle for applications, for example read-heads of hard disk drives and MRAMs.

If an organic material is inserted as tunneling barrier, the picture becomes more complex, as the formation of spin-hybridization-induced polarized states occurs. These states may affect the tunneling transmission coefficient, which is usually kept constant in the Jullière model. Barraud et al., in a Nature Physics paper, develop a spin transport model that takes into account the effect of the spinterface hybridization. What they observed is that the role of this hybridization in the spin tunneling process is not only relevant, but also capable of inverting the sign of the TMR. This opens the door to a new research front, aimed at tailoring the properties of spintronic devices through the right combination of ferromagnetic metals and molecules.

=== Spin Valves ===
Conventional spin valves are built in a very similar way with respect to magnetic tunneling junctions, the difference is that the two ferromagnetic electrodes are this time separated by a non-magnetic metal instead of an insulator. The physical principle exploited in this case is no longer related to tunneling but to electrical resistance.

Schematic of a pseudo spin valve

The spin-polarized current, coming from one ferromagnetic electrode, can travel in a non-magnetic metal for a certain distance, given by the spin diffusion length of that metal. When the current enters another ferromagnetic material, the relative orientation of the magnetization with respect to the first electrode can lead to a change in the resistance of the junction: if the alignment of the magnetizations is parallel, the spin valve will exhibit a low resistance state, while, in the case of antiparallel alignment, reflection and spin flip scattering events give rise to a high resistance state. From these considerations one can define and evaluate the magnetoresistance of the spin valve:

$MR = \frac{\rho_{ap} - \rho_p}{\rho_p}$

where $\rho_{ap}$ and $\rho_{p}$ are respectively the resistances for the antiparallel and parallel alignment.

The usual way of creating the possibility of having both parallel and antiparallel alignment is either pinning one of the electrodes by means of exchange bias or directly using different materials with different coercive fields for the two electrodes (pseudo spin valves). The proposed use of spinterfaces in spin valve applications is to interface one of the electrodes with a molecular layer, which is capable of tuning the magnetization properties of the electrode with a change in hybridization. This change of hybridization at the spinterface can be induced in principle both by light (making these systems suitable for ultra-fast applications) and electric voltages. If this process is reversible, there is the possibility of switching from high to low resistance in a very effective way, making the devices faster and more efficient.

== See also ==
- Spintronics
- Spin valve
- Tunnel magnetoresistance
- Giant magnetoresistance
- Molecular electronics
- Orbital hybridisation
