= Gallium manganese arsenide =

Gallium manganese arsenide, chemical formula (Ga,Mn)As is a magnetic semiconductor. It is based on the world's second most commonly used semiconductor, gallium arsenide, (chemical formula GaAs), and readily compatible with existing semiconductor technologies. Differently from other dilute magnetic semiconductors, such as the majority of those based on II-VI semiconductors, it is not paramagnetic but ferromagnetic, and hence exhibits hysteretic magnetization behavior. This memory effect is of importance for the creation of persistent devices. In (Ga,Mn)As, the manganese atoms provide a magnetic moment, and each also acts as an acceptor, making it a p-type material. The presence of carriers allows the material to be used for spin-polarized currents. In contrast, many other ferromagnetic magnetic semiconductors are strongly insulating and so do not possess free carriers. (Ga,Mn)As is therefore a candidate material for spintronic devices but it is likely to remain only a testbed for basic research as its Curie temperature could only be raised up to approximately 200 K.

== Growth ==
Like other magnetic semiconductors, (Ga,Mn)As is formed by doping a standard semiconductor with magnetic elements. This is done using the growth technique molecular beam epitaxy, whereby crystal structures can be grown with atom layer precision. In (Ga,Mn)As the manganese substitute into gallium sites in the GaAs crystal and provide a magnetic moment. Because manganese has a low solubility in GaAs, incorporating a sufficiently high concentration for ferromagnetism to be achieved proves challenging. In standard molecular beam epitaxy growth, to ensure that a good structural quality is obtained, the temperature the substrate is heated to, known as the growth temperature, is normally high, typically ~600 °C. However, if a large flux of manganese is used in these conditions, instead of being incorporated, segregation occurs where the manganese accumulate on the surface and form complexes with elemental arsenic atoms. This problem was overcome using the technique of low-temperature molecular beam epitaxy. It was found, first in (In,Mn)As and then later used for (Ga,Mn)As, that by utilising non-equilibrium crystal growth techniques larger dopant concentrations could be successfully incorporated. At lower temperatures, around 250 °C, there is insufficient thermal energy for surface segregation to occur but still sufficient for a good quality single crystal alloy to form.

In addition to the substitutional incorporation of manganese, low-temperature molecular beam epitaxy also causes the inclusion of other impurities. The two other common impurities are interstitial manganese and arsenic antisites. The former is where the manganese atom sits between the other atoms in the zinc-blende lattice structure and the latter is where an arsenic atom occupies a gallium site. Both impurities act as double donors, removing the holes provided by the substitutional manganese, and as such they are known as compensating defects. The interstitial manganese also bond antiferromagnetically to substitutional manganese, removing the magnetic moment. Both these defects are detrimental to the ferromagnetic properties of the (Ga,Mn)As, and so are undesired.

The temperature below which the transition from paramagnetism to ferromagnetism occurs is known as the Curie temperature, T_{C}. Theoretical predictions based on the Zener model suggest that the Curie temperature scales with the quantity of manganese, so T_{C} above 300K is possible if manganese doping levels as high as 10% can be achieved. After its discovery by Ohno et al., the highest reported Curie temperatures in(Ga,Mn)As rose from 60K to 110K. However, despite the predictions of room-temperature ferromagnetism, no improvements in T_{C} were made for several years.

As a result of this lack of progress, predictions started to be made that 110K was a fundamental limit for (Ga,Mn)As. The self-compensating nature of the defects would limit the possible hole concentrations, preventing further gains in T_{C}. The major breakthrough came from improvements in post-growth annealing. By using annealing temperatures comparable to the growth temperature it was possible to pass the 110K barrier. These improvements have been attributed to the removal of the highly mobile interstitial manganese.

Currently, the highest reported values of T_{C} in (Ga,Mn)As are around 173K, still well below the much sought room-temperature. As a result, measurements on this material must be done at cryogenic temperatures, currently precluding any application outside of the laboratory. Naturally, considerable effort is being spent in the search for an alternative magnetic semiconductors that does not share this limitation. In addition to this, as molecular beam epitaxy techniques and equipment are refined and improved it is hoped that greater control over growth conditions will allow further incremental advances in the Curie temperature of (Ga,Mn)As.

== Properties ==
Regardless of the fact that room-temperature ferromagnetism has not yet been achieved, magnetic semiconductors materials such as (Ga,Mn)As, have shown considerable success. Thanks to the rich interplay of physics inherent to magnetic semiconductors a variety of novel phenomena and device structures have been demonstrated. It is therefore instructive to make a critical review of these main developments.

A key result in magnetic semiconductors technology is gateable ferromagnetism, where an electric field is used to control the ferromagnetic properties. This was achieved by Ohno et al. using an insulating-gate field-effect transistor with (In,Mn)As as the magnetic channel. The magnetic properties were inferred from magnetization dependent Hall measurements of the channel. Using the gate action to either deplete or accumulate holes in the channel it was possible to change the characteristic of the Hall response to be either that of a paramagnet or of a ferromagnet. When the temperature of the sample was close to its T_{C} it was possible to turn the ferromagnetism on or off by applying a gate voltage which could change the T_{C} by ±1K.

A similar (In,Mn)As transistor device was used to provide further examples of gateable ferromagnetism. In this experiment the electric field was used to modify the coercive field at which magnetization reversal occurs. As a result of the dependence of the magnetic hysteresis on the gate bias the electric field could be used to assist magnetization reversal or even demagnetize the ferromagnetic material. The combining of magnetic and electronic functionality demonstrated by this experiment is one of the goals of spintronics and may be expected to have a great technological impact.

Another important spintronic functionality that has been demonstrated in magnetic semiconductors is that of spin injection. This is where the high spin polarization inherent to these magnetic materials is used to transfer spin polarized carriers into a non-magnetic material. In this example, a fully epitaxial heterostructure was used where spin polarized holes were injected from a (Ga,Mn)As layer to an (In,Ga)As quantum well where they combine with unpolarized electrons from an n-type substrate. A polarization of 8% was measured in the resulting electroluminescence. This is again of potential technological interest as it shows the possibility that the spin states in non-magnetic semiconductors can be manipulated without the application of a magnetic field.

(Ga,Mn)As offers an excellent material to study domain wall mechanics because the domains can have a size of the order of 100 μm. Several studies have been done in which lithographically defined lateral constrictions or other pinning points are used to manipulate domain walls. These experiments are crucial to understanding domain wall nucleation and propagation which would be necessary for the creation of complex logic circuits based on domain wall mechanics. Many properties of domain walls are still not fully understood and one particularly outstanding issue is of the magnitude and size of the resistance associated with current passing through domain walls. Both positive and negative values of domain wall resistance have been reported, leaving this an open area for future research.

An example of a simple device that utilizes pinned domain walls is provided by reference. This experiment consisted of a lithographically defined narrow island connected to the leads via a pair of nanoconstrictions. While the device operated in a diffusive regime the constrictions would pin domain walls, resulting in a giant magnetoresistance signal. When the device operates in a tunnelling regime another magnetoresistance effect is observed, discussed below.

A furtherproperty of domain walls is that of current induced domain wall motion. This reversal is believed to occur as a result of the spin-transfer torque exerted by a spin polarized current. It was demonstrated in reference using a lateral (Ga,Mn)As device containing three regions which had been patterned to have different coercive fields, allowing the easy formation of a domain wall. The central region was designed to have the lowest coercivity so that the application of current pulses could cause the orientation of the magnetization to be switched. This experiment showed that the current required to achieve this reversal in (Ga,Mn)Aswas two orders of magnitude lower than that of metal systems. It has also been demonstrated that current-induced magnetization reversal can occur across a (Ga,Mn)As/GaAs/(Ga,Mn)As vertical tunnel junction.

Another novel spintronic effect, which was first observed in (Ga,Mn)As based tunnel devices, is tunnelling anisotropic magnetoresistance. This effect arises from the intricate dependence of the tunnelling density of states on the magnetization, and can result in magnetoresistance of several orders of magnitude. This was demonstrated first in vertical tunnelling structures and then later in lateral devices. This has established tunnelling anisotropic magnetoresistance as a generic property of ferromagnetic tunnel structures. Similarly, the dependence of the single electron charging energy on the magnetization has resulted in the observation of another dramatic magnetoresistance effect in a (Ga,Mn)As device, the so-called Coulomb blockade anisotropic magnetoresistance.
