= Spinmechatronics =

Spinmechatronics /ˌspɪnəmɛkəˈtrɒnɪks/ is neologism referring to an emerging field of research concerned with the exploitation of spin-dependent phenomena and established spintronic methodologies and technologies in conjunction with electro-mechanical, magno-mechanical, acousto-mechanical and opto-mechanical systems. Most especially, spinmechatronics (or spin mechatronics) concerns the integration of micro- and nano- mechatronic systems with spin physics and spintronics.

== History and origins ==
While spinmechatronics has been recognised only recently (2008) as an independent field, hybrid spin-mechanical system development dates back to the early nineteen-nineties, with devices combining spintronics and micromechanics emerging at the turn of the twenty-first century.

One of the longest established spinmechatronic systems is the Magnetic Resonance Force Microscope or MRFM. First proposed by J. A. Sidles in a seminal paper of 1991 – and since extensively developed both theoretically and experimentally by a number of international research groups – the MRFM operates by coupling a magnetically loaded micro-mechanical cantilever to an excited nuclear, proton or electron spin system. The MRFM concept effectively combines scanning atomic force microscopy (AFM) with magnetic resonance spectroscopy to provide a spectroscopic tool of unparalleled sensitivity. Nanometre resolution is possible, and the technique potentially forms the basis for ultra-high sensitivity, ultra-high resolution magnetic, biochemical, biomedical, and clinical diagnostics.

The synergy of micromechanics and established spintronic technologies for sensing applications is one of the most significant spinmechatronic developments of the last decade. At the beginning of this century, strain sensors incorporating magnetoresistive technologies emerged and a wide range of devices exploiting similar principles are likely to realize research and commercial potential by 2015.

Contemporary innovation in spinmechatronics drives forward the independent advancement of cutting-edge science in spin physics, spintronics and micro- and nano-mechatronics and catalyses the development of wholly new instrumentation, control and fabrication techniques to facilitate and exploit their integration.

== Key constitutive technologies ==
=== Micro- and nano- mechatronics ===
MEMS: micro-electromechanical systems are the key ingredient of micro-mechatronics. Micro-electromechanical systems are – as the name suggests – devices with significant dimensions in the micrometre regime or less. Highly suited to integration with electronic and microwave circuitry, they provide the key to electro-mechanical functionalities unachievable with classical precision mechatronics. Commercialisation of mass-produced Microelectromechanical systems products is rapidly picking up pace and includes printer ink-jet technology, 3D accelerometers, integrated pressure sensors, and Digital Light Processing (DLP) displays. At the cutting edge of Microelectromechanical systems fabrication and integration technologies are nano- electromechanical systems (NEMS). Typical examples are micrometres long, tens of nanometres thick, and have mechanical resonance frequencies approaching 100 MHz. Their small physical dimensions and mass (of order pico-grams) makes them highly sensitive to changes in stiffness; this, their synergy with mechanical and data processing systems, and the option of attaching chemical/ biological molecules, makes them ideal for ultra high-performance mechanical, chemical and biological sensing applications.

=== Spin physics ===
Spin physics is a broad and active area of condensed-matter physics research. 'Spin' in this context refers to a quantum mechanical property of certain elementary particles and nuclei, and should not be confused with the classical (and better-known) concept of rotation. Spin physics spans studies of nuclear, electron and proton magnetic resonance, magnetism, and certain areas of optics. Spintronics is a branch of spin physics. Perhaps the two best known applications of spin physics are Magnetic Resonance Imaging (or MRI) and the spintronic giant-magnetoresistive (GMR) hard disk read head.

=== Spintronics ===
Spintronic magnetoresistance is a major scientific and commercial success story. Today, most families own a spintronic device: the giant-magnetoresistive (GMR) hard disk read head in their computer. The science that gave rise to this phenomenal business opportunity – and earned the 2007 Nobel Prize for Physics – was the recognition that electrical carriers are characterized by both charge and spin. Today, tunnelling-magnetoresistance (TMR) – which uses the electron spin as a label to allow or forbid electron tunnelling – dominates the hard disk market and is rapidly establishing itself in areas as diverse as magnetic logic devices and biosensors. Ongoing development is pushing the frontiers of TMR devices towards the nanoscale.

== See also ==
- Spintronics
- Mechatronics
- Microelectromechanical systems
- Nanoelectromechanical systems
- Magnetic resonance force microscopy
- List of nanotechnology applications
- Giant magnetoresistance
- Albert Fert
- Peter Grünberg
- Nobel Prize in Physics
- Hard disk drive
- Magnetism
- Quantum tunnelling
