= Exchange bias =

Exchange bias or exchange anisotropy occurs in bilayers (or multilayers) of magnetic materials where the hard magnetization behavior of an antiferromagnetic thin film causes a shift in the soft magnetization curve of a ferromagnetic film. The exchange bias phenomenon is of tremendous utility in magnetic recording, where it is used to pin the state of the readback heads of hard disk drives at exactly their point of maximum sensitivity; hence the term "bias."

== Fundamental science ==
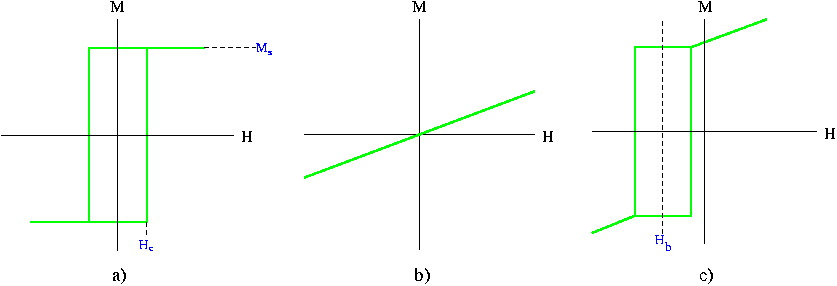
Easy-axis magnetization curves of a) a soft ferromagnetic film; b) an antiferromagnetic film and c) an exchange-biased bilayer consisting of a ferromagnet and an antiferromagnet. The susceptibility (slope) of the antiferromagnetic's magnetization curve is exaggerated for clarity.

The essential physics underlying the phenomenon is the exchange interaction between the antiferromagnet and ferromagnet at their interface. Since antiferromagnets have a small or no net magnetization, their spin orientation is only weakly influenced by an externally applied magnetic field. A soft ferromagnetic film which is strongly exchange-coupled to the antiferromagnet will have its interfacial spins pinned. Reversal of the ferromagnet's moment will have an added energetic cost corresponding to the energy necessary to create a Néel domain wall within the antiferromagnetic film. The added energy term implies a shift in the switching field of the ferromagnet. Thus the magnetization curve of an exchange-biased ferromagnetic film looks like that of the normal ferromagnet except that is shifted away from the H=0 axis by an amount H_{b}.

In most well-studied ferromagnet/antiferromagnet bilayers, the Curie temperature of the ferromagnet is larger than the Néel temperature T_{N} of the antiferromagnet. This inequality means that the direction of the exchange bias can be set by cooling through T_{N} in the presence of an applied magnetic field. The moment of the magnetically ordered ferromagnet will apply an effective field to the antiferromagnet as it orders, breaking the symmetry and influencing the formation of domains.

The exchange bias effect is attributed to a ferromagnetic unidirectional anisotropy formed at the interface between different magnetic phases. Generally, the process of field cooling from higher temperature is used to obtain ferromagnetic unidirectional anisotropy in different exchange bias systems. In 2011, a large exchange bias has been realized after zero-field cooling of a bulk alloy from an unmagnetized state, which was attributed to the newly formed interface between different magnetic phases during the initial magnetization process.

Exchange anisotropy has long been poorly understood due to the difficulty of studying the dynamics of domain walls in thin antiferromagnetic films. A naive approach to the problem would suggest the following expression for energy per unit area:

$E = \frac{1}{2} n J_{ex} S_F S_{AF} + M_F t_F H$

where n is the number of interfacial spins interactions per unit area, J_{ex} is the exchange constant at the interface, S refers to the spin vector, M refers to the magnetization, t refers to film thickness and H is the external field. The subscript F describes the properties of the ferromagnet and AF to the antiferromagnet. The expression omits magnetocrystalline anisotropy, which is unaffected by the presence of the antiferromagnet. At the switching field of the ferromagnet, the pinning energy represented by the first term and the Zeeman dipole coupling represented by the second term will exactly balance. The equation then predicts that the exchange bias shift H_{b} will be given by the expression

$H_b = \frac{n J_{ex} S_F S_{AF}}{2 M_F t_F}$

Many experimental findings regarding the exchange bias contradict this simple model. For example, the magnitude of measured H_{b} values is typically 100 times less than that predicted by the equation for reasonable values of the parameters. The amount of hysteresis shift H_{b} is not correlated with the density n of uncompensated spins in the plane of the antiferromagnet that appears at the interface. In addition, the exchange bias effect tends to be smaller in epitaxial bilayers than in polycrystalline ones, suggesting an important role for defects. In recent years progress in fundamental understanding has been made via synchrotron radiation based element-specific magnetic linear dichroism experiments that can image antiferromagnetic domains and frequency-dependent magnetic susceptibility measurements that can probe the dynamics. Experiments on the Fe/FeF_{2} and Fe/MnF_{2} model systems have been particularly fruitful.

== Technological impact ==
Exchange bias was initially used to stabilize the magnetization of soft ferromagnetic layers in readback heads based on the anisotropic magnetoresistance (AMR) effect. Without the stabilization, the magnetic domain state of the head could be unpredictable, leading to reliability problems. Currently, exchange bias is used to pin the harder reference layer in spin valve readback heads and MRAM memory circuits that utilize the giant magnetoresistance or magnetic tunneling effect. Similarly, the most advanced disk media are antiferromagnetically coupled, making use of interfacial exchange to effectively increase the stability of small magnetic particles whose behavior would otherwise be superparamagnetic.

Desirable properties for an exchange bias material include a high Néel temperature, a large magnetocrystalline anisotropy and good chemical and structural compatibility with NiFe and Co, the most important ferromagnetic films. The most technologically significant exchange bias materials have been the rocksalt-structure antiferromagnetic oxides like NiO, CoO and their alloys and the rocksalt-structure intermetallics like FeMn, NiMn, IrMn and their alloys.

== History ==
Exchange anisotropy was discovered by Meiklejohn and Bean of General Electric in 1956. The first commercial device to employ the exchange bias was IBM's anisotropic magnetoresistance (AMR) disk drive recording head, which was based on a design by Hunt in the 1970s but which didn't fully displace the inductive readback head until the early 1990s. By the mid-1990s, the spin valve head using an exchange-bias layer was well on its way to displacing the AMR head.
