= Spintronics =

Solid-state electronics based on electron spin

Spintronics (a portmanteau of spin transport electronics), also known as spin electronics, is the study of the intrinsic spin of the electron and its associated magnetic moment, in addition to its fundamental electronic charge, in solid-state devices. The field of spintronics concerns spin-charge coupling in metallic systems. The analogous effects in insulators fall into the field of multiferroics.

Spintronics fundamentally differs from traditional electronics in that, in addition to charge state, electron spins are used as a further degree of freedom, with implications in the efficiency of data storage and transfer. Spintronic systems are most often realised in dilute magnetic semiconductors (DMS) and Heusler alloys and are of particular interest in the field of quantum computing, such as atomtronics computation.

== History ==
Spintronics emerged from discoveries in the 1980s concerning spin-dependent electron transport phenomena in solid-state devices. This includes the observation of spin-polarized electron injection from a ferromagnetic metal to a normal metal by Johnson and Silsbee (1985) and the discovery of giant magnetoresistance independently by Albert Fert et al. and Peter Grünberg et al. (1988), for which they won the 2007 Nobel prize in Physics. The origin of spintronics can be traced to the ferromagnet/superconductor tunneling experiments pioneered by Meservey and Tedrow and initial experiments on magnetic tunnel junctions by Julliere in the 1970s. The use of semiconductors for spintronics began with the theoretical proposal of a spin field-effect-transistor by Datta and Das in 1990 and of the electric dipole spin resonance by Rashba in 1960.

In 2012, persistent spin helices of synchronized electrons were made to persist for more than a nanosecond, a 30-fold increase over earlier efforts, and longer than the duration of a modern processor clock cycle.

In 2025, at 60 K (−213.2 °C; −351.7 °F) crystalline nickel(II) iodide (NiI_{2}) was reported to exhibit p-wave magnetism, in which the spins of nickel atoms became arranged in a spiral pattern in two orientations. The orientations can be switched via a small electrical current. Applied in digital devices, this spintronics behavior requires far less current than the conventional charge-based electronics that powers devices such as computers and phones.

== Theory ==
The spin of the electron is an intrinsic angular momentum that is separate from the angular momentum due to its orbital motion. The magnitude of the projection of the electron's spin along an arbitrary axis is $\tfrac{1}{2}\hbar$, implying that the electron acts as a fermion by the spin-statistics theorem. Like orbital angular momentum, the spin has an associated magnetic moment, the magnitude of which is expressed as

$$\mu=\tfrac{\sqrt{3}}{2}\frac{q}{m_e}\hbar$$.

In a solid, the spins of many electrons can act together to affect the magnetic and electronic properties of a material, for example endowing it with a permanent magnetic moment as in a ferromagnet.

In many materials, electron spins are equally present in both the up and the down state, and no transport properties are dependent on spin. A spintronic device requires generation or manipulation of a spin-polarized population of electrons, resulting in an excess of spin up or spin down electrons. The polarization of any spin dependent property X can be written as

$$P_X=\frac{X_{\uparrow}-X_{\downarrow}}{X_{\uparrow}+X_{\downarrow}}$$.

A net spin polarization can be achieved either through creating an equilibrium energy split between spin up and spin down. Methods include putting a material in a large magnetic field (Zeeman effect), the exchange energy present in a ferromagnet or forcing the system out of equilibrium. The period of time that such a non-equilibrium population can be maintained is known as the spin lifetime, $\tau$.

In a diffusive conductor, a spin diffusion length $\lambda$ can be defined as the distance over which a non-equilibrium spin population can propagate. Spin lifetimes of conduction electrons in metals are relatively short (typically less than 1 nanosecond). An important research area is devoted to extending this lifetime to technologically relevant timescales.

A plot showing a spin up, spin down, and the resulting spin polarized population of electrons. Inside a spin injector, the polarization is constant, while outside the injector, the polarization decays exponentially to zero as the spin up and down populations go to equilibrium.

The mechanisms of decay for a spin polarized population can be broadly classified as spin-flip scattering and spin dephasing. Spin-flip scattering is a process inside a solid that does not conserve spin, and can therefore switch an incoming spin up state into an outgoing spin down state. Spin dephasing is the process wherein a population of electrons with a common spin state becomes less polarized over time due to different rates of electron spin precession. In confined structures, spin dephasing can be suppressed, leading to spin lifetimes of milliseconds in semiconductor quantum dots at low temperatures.

Superconductors can enhance central effects in spintronics such as magnetoresistance effects, spin lifetimes and dissipationless spin-currents.

The simplest method of generating a spin-polarised current in a metal is to pass the current through a ferromagnetic material. The most common applications of this effect involve giant magnetoresistance (GMR) devices. A typical GMR device consists of at least two layers of ferromagnetic materials separated by a spacer layer. When the two magnetization vectors of the ferromagnetic layers are aligned, the electrical resistance will be lower (so a higher current flows at constant voltage) than if the ferromagnetic layers are anti-aligned. This constitutes a magnetic field sensor.

Two variants of GMR have been applied in devices:

- Current-in-plane (CIP), where the electric current flows parallel to the layers and,
- Current-perpendicular-to-plane (CPP), where the electric current flows in a direction perpendicular to the layers.

Other metal-based spintronics devices:

- Tunnel magnetoresistance (TMR), where CPP transport is achieved by using quantum-mechanical tunneling of electrons through a thin insulator separating ferromagnetic layers.
- Spin-transfer torque, where a current of spin-polarized electrons is used to control the magnetization direction of ferromagnetic electrodes in the device.
- Spin-wave logic devices carry information in the phase. Interference and spin-wave scattering can perform logic operations.

== Device types ==
=== Spintronic-logic ===
Non-volatile spin-logic devices to enable scaling are being extensively studied. Spin-transfer, torque-based logic devices that use spins and magnets for information processing have been proposed. These devices are part of the ITRS exploratory road map. Logic-in memory applications are already in the development stage. A 2017 review article can be found in Materials Today.

A generalized circuit theory for spintronic integrated circuits has been proposed so that the physics of spin transport can be utilized by SPICE developers and subsequently by circuit and system designers for the exploration of spintronics for "beyond CMOS computing".

=== Semiconductor ===
Doped semiconductor materials display dilute ferromagnetism. In recent years, dilute magnetic oxides (DMOs) including ZnO based DMOs and TiO_{2}-based DMOs have been the subject of numerous experimental and computational investigations. N`0 sources (like manganese-doped gallium arsenide (Ga,Mn)As), increase the interface resistance with a tunnel barrier, or using hot-electron injection.

Spin detection in semiconductors has been addressed with multiple techniques:

- Faraday/Kerr rotation of transmitted/reflected photons
- Circular polarization analysis of electroluminescence
- Nonlocal spin valve (adapted from Johnson and Silsbee's work with metals)
- Ballistic spin filtering

The latter technique was used to overcome the lack of spin-orbit interaction and materials issues to achieve spin transport in silicon.

Because external magnetic fields (and stray fields from magnetic contacts) can cause large Hall effects and magnetoresistance in semiconductors (which mimic spin-valve effects), the only conclusive evidence of spin transport in semiconductors is demonstration of spin precession and dephasing in a magnetic field non-collinear to the injected spin orientation, called the Hanle effect.

=== Storage media ===
Antiferromagnetic storage media have been studied as an alternative to ferromagnetism, especially since with antiferromagnetic material the bits can be stored as well as with ferromagnetic material. Instead of the usual definition 0 ↔ 'magnetisation upwards', 1 ↔ 'magnetisation downwards', the states can be, e.g., 0 ↔ 'vertically alternating spin configuration' and 1 ↔ 'horizontally-alternating spin configuration'.).

The main advantages of antiferromagnetic material are:

- insensitivity to data-damaging perturbations by stray fields due to zero net external magnetization;
- no effect on near particles, implying that antiferromagnetic device elements would not magnetically disturb its neighboring elements;
- far shorter switching times (antiferromagnetic resonance frequency is in the THz range compared to GHz ferromagnetic resonance frequency);
- broad range of commonly available antiferromagnetic materials including insulators, semiconductors, semimetals, metals, and superconductors.

Research is being done into how to read and write information to antiferromagnetic spintronics as their net zero magnetization makes this difficult compared to conventional ferromagnetic spintronics. In modern MRAM, detection and manipulation of ferromagnetic order by magnetic fields has largely been abandoned in favor of more efficient and scalable reading and writing by electrical current. Methods of reading and writing information by current rather than fields are also being investigated in antiferromagnets as fields are ineffective anyway. Writing methods currently being investigated in antiferromagnets are through spin-transfer torque and spin-orbit torque from the spin Hall effect and the Rashba effect. Reading information in antiferromagnets via magnetoresistance effects such as tunnel magnetoresistance is also being explored.

== Applications ==
=== MRAM ===
Motorola developed a first-generation 256 kb magnetoresistive random-access memory (MRAM) based on a single magnetic tunnel junction and a single transistor that has a read/write cycle of under 50 nanoseconds. Everspin has since developed a 4 Mb version. Two second-generation MRAM techniques are in development: thermal-assisted switching (TAS) and spin-transfer torque (STT).

Read heads of magnetic hard drives are based on the GMR or TMR effect.

=== Racetrack memory ===
Another design, racetrack memory, a novel memory architecture proposed by Dr. Stuart S. P. Parkin, encodes information in the direction of magnetization between domain walls of a ferromagnetic wire.

=== Semiconductor laser ===
Applications using spin-polarized electrical injection have shown threshold current reduction and controllable circularly polarized coherent light output. Examples include semiconductor lasers. Future applications may include a spin-based transistor having advantages over MOSFET devices such as steeper sub-threshold slope.

=== Magnetic-tunnel transistor ===
Magnetic-tunnel transistors (MTT) enable highly spin-polarized electron sources at room temperature. MTTs with a single base layer has the following terminals:

- Emitter (FM1): Injects spin-polarized hot electrons into the base.
- Base (FM2): Spin-dependent scattering takes place in the base. It also serves as a spin filter.
- Collector (GaAs): A Schottky barrier is formed at the interface. It only collects electrons that have enough energy to overcome the Schottky barrier, and when states are available in the semiconductor.

The magnetocurrent (MC) is given as:

$$MC = \frac{I_{c,p}-I_{c,ap}}{I_{c,ap}}$$

And the transfer ratio (TR) is

$$TR = \frac{I_C}{I_E}$$

=== Neuromorphic computing ===
Another important application of spin-based magnetic devices is in neuromorphic computing, where the goal is to emulate computational principles of biological neural systems. In modern artificial intelligence models, training requires millions of computational operations, which is challenging for conventional computing architectures. Traditional computing follows the von Neumann architecture, where memory and computational units are physically separate. This separation forces data to move back and forth during computation, creating a significant bottleneck. By offering low-energy operation, high endurance, nanoscale scalability, and non-volatility, spintronic devices are strong candidates for neuromorphic computing because these characteristics align well with the demands of brain-inspired architectures.

In such systems, spintronic elements such as magnetic tunnel junctions (MTJs), domain wall nanotracks, skyrmion-based devices, and spin-torque nano-oscillators are used to implement neuronal and synaptic functions by exploiting the magnetization dynamics of nanoscale ferromagnets. These devices can inherently realize operations such as temporal integration, leakage, threshold activation, and synaptic plasticity through the behavior of magnetic moments under spin-transfer torque or spin–orbit torque.

Domain-wall–based MTJs, for example, replicate the leaky-integrate-and-fire model by mapping the membrane potential to the position of a driven magnetic domain wall. Skyrmion-based synapses encode synaptic weights in the number or configuration of skyrmions within a nanotrack, enabling weighted summation of input spikes through their current-driven motion. Other spintronic implementations, such as stochastic low-barrier nanomagnets used as probabilistic bits, support noise-driven neural and probabilistic computing in a hardware-efficient manner.

Because spintronic devices are non-volatile, highly scalable, and capable of sub-femtojoule switching energies, they are capable of compact neuromorphic systems that merge memory and computation within the same physical medium. Ongoing research focuses on improving device uniformity, lowering operational energy, achieving large-scale integration with CMOS circuitry, and developing novel magnetic materials to enhance neuromorphic functionality.

== See also ==
- Stuart S. P. Parkin
- Electric dipole spin resonance
- Josephson effect
- Magnonics
- Potential applications of graphene#Spintronics
- Probabilistic Computing
- Rashba effect
- Spin pumping
- Spin-transfer torque
- Spinhenge@Home
- Spinmechatronics
- Spinplasmonics
- Unconventional computing
- Valleytronics
- List of emerging technologies
- Multiferroics
