= Extraordinary magnetoresistance =

Geometrical magnetoresistance effect

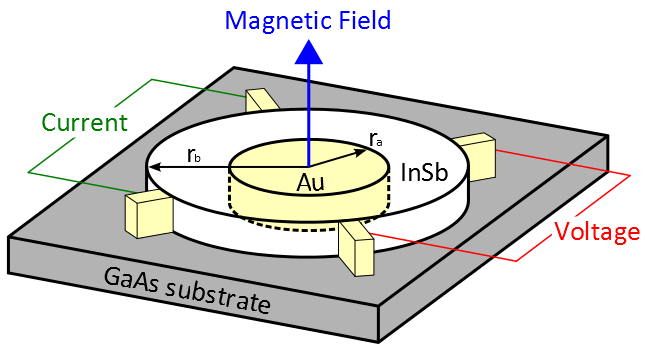
Diagram of a typical circular geometry semiconductor–metal hybrid EMR system.

Extraordinary magnetoresistance (EMR) is a geometrical magnetoresistance effect discovered in 2000, where the change in electrical resistance upon the application of a large magnetic field can be greater than 1,000,000% at room temperature (orders of magnitude greater than other magnetoresistance effects such as GMR and CMR). The effect occurs in semiconductor-metal hybrid systems when a transverse magnetic field is applied. Without a magnetic field the system is in a low-resistance state with most of the current flow directed through the metallic region. Upon the application of a large magnetic field the system switches to a state of much higher electrical resistance, due to the Hall angle approaching 90°, with the current flow inside the metallic region dramatically reduced. The effect is influenced greatly by the system geometry, with an enhancement of over four orders of magnitude shown to be possible with an alternative branched geometry. Since the EMR effect occurs at room temperature and does not rely on magnetic materials it has many possible benefits for applications including in the read heads of future hard disk drives.
