= Spinplasmonics =

Field of nanotechnology combining spintronics and plasmonics

Spinplasmonics is a field of nanotechnology combining spintronics and plasmonics. The field was pioneered by Abdulhakem Elezzabi, a professor at the University of Alberta in Canada. In a simple spinplasmonic device, light waves couple to electron spin states in a metallic structure. The most elementary spinplasmonic device consists of a bilayer structure made from magnetic and nonmagnetic metals. It is the nanometer scale interface between such metals that gives rise to an electron spin phenomenon. The plasmonic current is generated by optical excitation and its properties are manipulated by applying a weak magnetic field. Electrons with a specific spin state can cross the interfacial barrier, but those with a different spin state are impeded. Essentially, switching operations are performed with the electrons spin and then sent out as a light signal.

Spinplasmonic devices potentially have the advantages of high speed, miniaturization, low power consumption, and multifunctionality. On a length scale that is less than a single magnetic domain size, the interaction between atomic spins realigns the magnetic moments. Unlike semiconductor-based devices, smaller spinplasmonics devices are expected to be more efficient in transporting the spin-polarized electron current.

== See also ==
- Plasmon
- Spintronics
- Spin pumping
- Spin transfer
- List of emerging technologies
