= Magnetic semiconductor =

Type of functional semiconducting oxide

Unsolved problem in physics
Can we build materials that show properties of both ferromagnets and semiconductors at room temperature?
More unsolved problems in physics

Magnetic semiconductors are semiconductor materials that exhibit both ferromagnetism (or a similar response) and useful semiconductor properties. If implemented in devices, these materials could provide a new type of control of conduction. Whereas traditional electronics are based on control of charge carriers (n- or p-type), practical magnetic semiconductors would also allow control of quantum spin state (up or down). This would theoretically provide near-total spin polarization (as opposed to iron and other metals, which provide only ~50% polarization), which is an important property for spintronics applications, e.g. spin transistors.

While many traditional magnetic materials, such as magnetite, are also semiconductors (magnetite is a semimetal semiconductor with bandgap 0.14 eV), materials scientists generally predict that magnetic semiconductors will only find widespread use if they are similar to well-developed semiconductor materials. To that end, dilute magnetic semiconductors (DMS) have recently been a major focus of magnetic semiconductor research. These are based on traditional semiconductors, but are doped with transition metals instead of, or in addition to, electronically active elements. They are of interest because of their unique spintronics properties with possible technological applications. Doped wide band-gap metal oxides such as zinc oxide (ZnO) and titanium oxide (TiO_{2}) are among the best candidates for industrial DMS due to their multifunctionality in opticomagnetic applications. In particular, ZnO-based DMS with properties such as transparency in visual region and piezoelectricity have generated interest among the scientific community as a strong candidate for the fabrication of spin transistors and spin-polarized light-emitting diodes, while copper doped TiO_{2} in the anatase phase of this material has further been predicted to exhibit favorable dilute magnetism.

Hideo Ohno and his group at the Tohoku University were the first to measure ferromagnetism in transition metal doped compound semiconductors such as indium arsenide and gallium arsenide doped with manganese (the latter is commonly referred to as GaMnAs). These materials exhibited reasonably high Curie temperatures (yet below room temperature) that scales with the concentration of p-type charge carriers. Ever since, ferromagnetic signals have been measured from various semiconductor hosts doped with different transition atoms.

== Theory ==
The pioneering work of Dietl et al. showed that a modified Zener model for magnetism well describes the carrier dependence, as well as anisotropic properties of GaMnAs. The same theory also predicted that room-temperature ferromagnetism should exist in heavily p-type doped ZnO and GaN doped by Co and Mn, respectively. These predictions were followed of a flurry of theoretical and experimental studies of various oxide and nitride semiconductors, which apparently seemed to confirm room temperature ferromagnetism in nearly any semiconductor or insulator material heavily doped by transition metal impurities. However, early Density functional theory (DFT) studies were clouded by band gap errors and overly delocalized defect levels, and more advanced DFT studies refute most of the previous predictions of ferromagnetism. Likewise, it has been shown that for most of the oxide based materials studies for magnetic semiconductors do not exhibit an intrinsic carrier-mediated ferromagnetism as postulated by Dietl et al. To date, GaMnAs remains the only semiconductor material with robust coexistence of ferromagnetism persisting up to rather high Curie temperatures around 100–200 K.

== Materials ==
The manufacturability of the materials depend on the thermal equilibrium solubility of the dopant in the base material. E.g., solubility of many dopants in zinc oxide is high enough to prepare the materials in bulk, while some other materials have so low solubility of dopants that to prepare them with high enough dopant concentration thermal nonequilibrium preparation mechanisms have to be employed, e.g. growth of thin films.

Permanent magnetization has been observed in a wide range of semiconductor based materials. Some of them exhibit a clear correlation between carrier density and magnetization, including the work of T. Story and co-workers where they demonstrated that the ferromagnetic Curie temperature of Mn^{2+}-doped Pb_{1−x}Sn_{x}Te can be controlled by the carrier concentration. The theory proposed by Dietl required charge carriers in the case of holes to mediate the magnetic coupling of manganese dopants in the prototypical magnetic semiconductor, Mn^{2+}-doped GaAs. If there is an insufficient hole concentration in the magnetic semiconductor, then the Curie temperature would be very low or would exhibit only paramagnetism. However, if the hole concentration is high (> ~10^{20} cm^{−3}), then the Curie temperature would be higher, between 100 and 200 K. However, many of the semiconductor materials studied exhibit a permanent magnetization extrinsic to the semiconductor host material. A lot of the elusive extrinsic ferromagnetism (or phantom ferromagnetism) is observed in thin films or nanostructured materials.

Several examples of proposed ferromagnetic semiconductor materials are listed below. Notice that many of the observations and/or predictions below remain heavily debated.

- Manganese-doped indium arsenide and gallium arsenide (GaMnAs), with Curie temperature around 50–100 K and 100–200 K, respectively
- Manganese-doped indium antimonide, which becomes ferromagnetic even at room temperature and even with less than 1% Mn.
- Oxide semiconductors
  - Manganese- and iron-doped indium oxide, ferromagnetic at room temperature. The ferromagnetism appears to be mediated by carrier-electrons, in a similar way as the GaMnAs ferromagnetism is mediated by carrier-holes.
  - Zinc oxide
    - Manganese-doped zinc oxide
    - n-type cobalt-doped zinc oxide
  - Magnesium oxide:
    - p-type transparent MgO films with cation vacancies, combining ferromagnetism and multilevel switching (memristor)
  - Titanium dioxide:
    - Cobalt-doped titanium dioxide (both rutile and anatase), ferromagnetic above 400 K
    - Chromium-doped rutile, ferromagnetic above 400 K
    - Iron-doped rutile and iron-doped anatase, ferromagnetic at room temperature
    - Copper-doped anatase
    - Nickel-doped anatase
  - Tin dioxide
    - Manganese-doped tin dioxide, with Curie temperature at 340 K
    - Iron-doped tin dioxide, with Curie temperature at 340 K
    - Strontium-doped tin dioxide (SrSnO_{2}) – Dilute magnetic semiconductor. Can be synthesized an epitaxial thin film on a silicon chip.
  - Europium(II) oxide, with a Curie temperature of 69 K. The curie temperature can be more than doubled by doping (e.g. oxygen deficiency, Gd).
- Nitride semiconductors
  - Chromium doped aluminium nitride
- (Ba,K)(Zn,Mn)_{2}As_{2}: Ferromagnetic semiconductor with tetragonal average structure and orthorhombic local structure.
