= Spin pumping =

Generation of spin current

Spin pumping is the dynamical generation of pure spin current by the coherent precession of magnetic moments, which can efficiently inject spin from a magnetic material into an adjacent non-magnetic material. The non-magnetic material usually hosts the spin Hall effect that can convert the injected spin current into a charge voltage easy to detect. A spin pumping experiment typically requires electromagnetic irradiation to induce magnetic resonance, which converts energy and angular momenta from electromagnetic waves (usually microwaves) to magnetic dynamics and then to electrons, enabling the electronic detection of electromagnetic waves. The device operation of spin pumping can be regarded as the spintronic analog of a battery.

Spin pumping involves an AC effect and a DC effect:

- The AC effect generates a spin current that oscillates at the same frequency with the microwave source.
- The DC effect requires that the magnetic dynamic is circularly polarized or elliptically polarized, whereas a linear oscillation can only generate an AC component.
- Both effects result in a net enhancement of the effective magnetic damping.

== Spin pumping in ferromagnets ==
The spin current pumped into an adjacent layer by a precessing magnetic moment is given by

$$\vec j_s = {\hbar \over {4 \pi}} g^{\uparrow \downarrow} {1 \over M_S^2} \langle \vec M(t) \times {{d \vec M(t))} \over {dt}} \rangle$$

where $\vec j_s$ is the spin current (the vector indicates the orientation of the spin, not the direction of the current), $g^{\uparrow \downarrow}$ is the spin-mixing conductance characterizing the spin transparency of the interface, $M_S$ is the saturation magnetization, and $\vec M(t)$ is the time-dependent orientation of the moment.

Optical, microwave and electrical methods are also being explored. These devices could be used for low-power data transmission in spintronic devices or to transmit electrical signals through insulators.

== Spin pumping in antiferromagnets ==
Spin pumping in antiferromagnetic materials does not vanish because the antiparallel magnetic moments contribute constructively rather than destructively to spin current, which was theoretically predicted in 2014. Since the frequency of antiferromagnetic resonance is much higher than that of ferromagnetic resonance, spin pumping in antiferromagnets can be utilized to study electromagnetic signals in the sub-terahertz and terahertz regime, which had been demonstrated by two independent experiments in 2020.

Besides higher frequency, spin pumping in antiferromagnets features the chirality degree of freedom of magnetic dynamics that does not exist in ferromagnets. For example, the spin currents pumped by the left-handed and the right-handed resonance modes are opposite in direction.

== See also ==
- Spintronics
- Spin wave
- Spin Hall effect
