= Cantilever magnetometry =

Cantilever magnetometry is the use of a cantilever to measure the magnetic moment of magnetic particles. On the end of cantilever is attached a small piece of magnetic material, which interacts with external magnetic fields and exerts torque on the cantilever. These torques cause the cantilever to oscillate faster or slower, depending on the orientation of the particle's moment with respect to the external field, and the magnitude of the moment. The magnitude of the moment and magnetic anisotropy of the material can be deduced by measuring the cantilever's oscillation frequency versus external field.

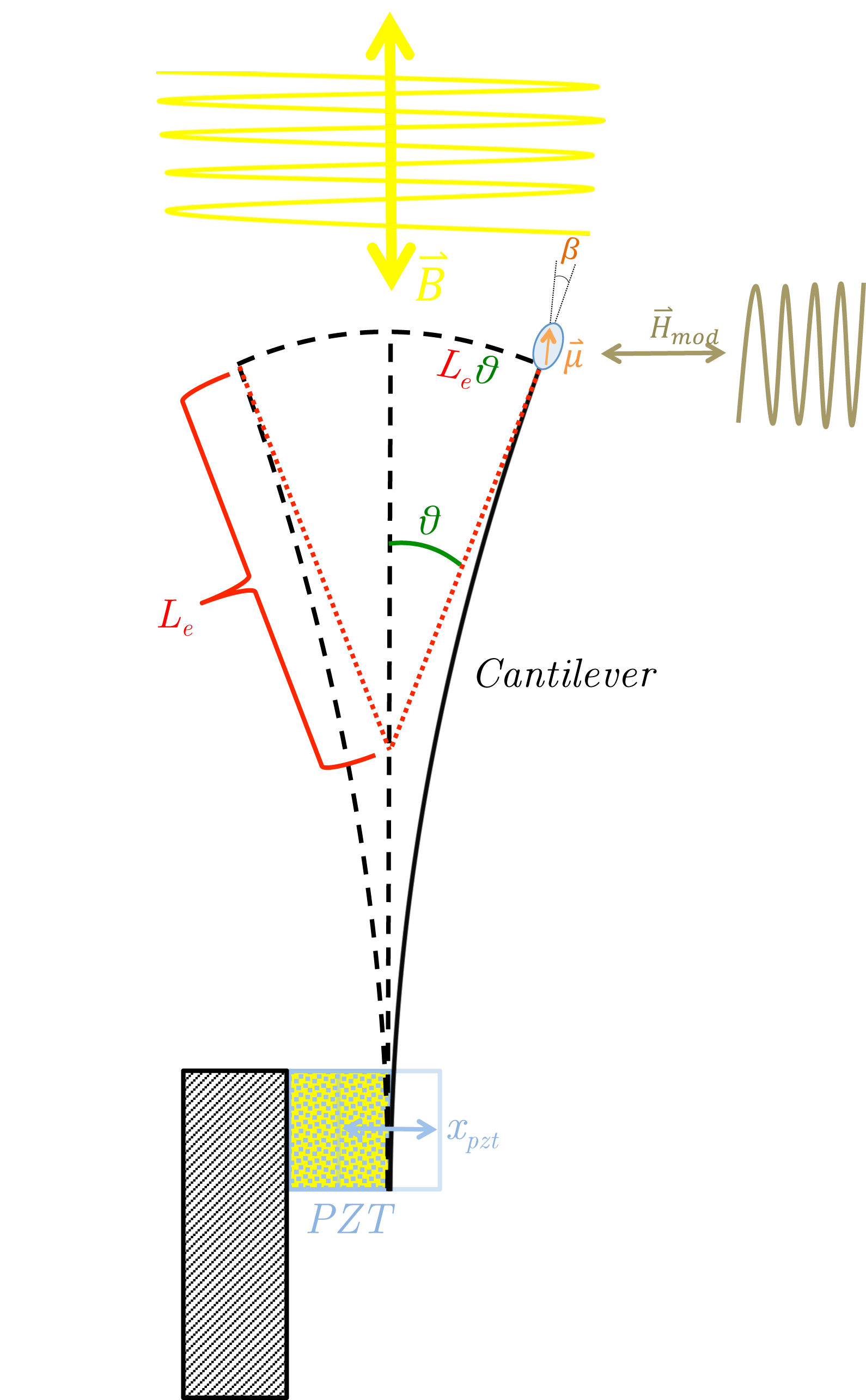
A cantilever with a magnetic particle oscillating in an external magnetic field. Many setups do not have a modulation coil as pictured above. Capacitive coupling can be used in place of a piezoelectric transducer (PZT) to drive the cantilever

A useful, although limited analogy is that of a pendulum: on earth it oscillates with one frequency, while the same pendulum on, say, the moon, would oscillate with a slower frequency. This is because the mass on the end of the pendulum interacts with the external gravitational field, much as a magnetic moment interacts with an external magnetic field.

== Cantilever equation of motion ==
As the cantilever oscillates back and forth it arches into hyperbolic curves with the salient feature that a tangent to the end of the cantilever always intersects one point along the middle axis. From this we define the effective length of the cantilever, $L_{e}$, to be the distance from this point to the end of the cantilever (see image to the right). The Lagrangian for this system is then given by

$\mathcal{L}=T-V=\frac{1}{2}m\underbrace{(L_{e}\dot{\theta})^{2}}_{v^2}-\left(\underbrace{\frac{1}{2}k ( L_{e} \theta )^{2}}_{\begin{smallmatrix}\text{Restoring}\\ \text{Energy}\end{smallmatrix}}-\underbrace{\mu B \cos{(\theta-\beta)}}_{\begin{smallmatrix}\text{Zeeman}\\ \text{Energy}\end{smallmatrix}}+\underbrace{K_uV\sin^2{\beta}}_{\begin{smallmatrix}\text{Anisotropy}\\ \text{Energy}\end{smallmatrix}}\right)$	Eq. 1

where $m$ is the effective cantilever mass, $V$ is the volume of the particle, $k$ is the cantilever-constant and $\mu$ is the magnetic moment of the particle. To find the equation of motion we note that we have two variables, $\theta$ and $\beta$ so there are two corresponding Lagrangian equations which need to be solved as a system of equations,

$$\frac{d}{d t}\frac{\partial \mathcal{L}}{\partial \dot{\beta}}=\frac{\partial \mathcal{L}}{\partial \beta}\Rightarrow 0=\mu B \sin{ (\theta-\beta)}-2K_uV\underbrace{\sin\beta \cos\beta}_{\approx \beta} \Rightarrow$$

$\beta=\frac{B\theta}{B+H_k}$	Eq. 2

where we have defined $H_k\equiv\frac{2K_uV}{\mu}$.

We can plug Eq. 1 into our Lagrangian, which then becomes a function of $\theta$ only. Then $(\theta - \beta)=\frac{\theta H_k}{B+H_k}$, and we have

$$\frac{d}{d t}\frac{\partial \mathcal{L}}{\partial \dot{\theta}}=\frac{\partial \mathcal{L}}{\partial \theta}\Rightarrow$$
$$mL_{e}^{2}\ddot{\theta}=-kL_{e}^{2}\theta-\mu B \sin{\left(\frac{\theta H_k}{B+H_k}\right)}\left(\frac{H_k}{B+H_k}\right)-2K_uV\sin{\left(\frac{\theta B}{B+H_k}\right)}\cos{\left(\frac{\theta B}{B+H_k}\right)}\left(\frac{B}{B+H_k}\right)\Rightarrow$$
$$\approx -kL_{e}^{2}\theta-\mu B \theta\left(\frac{ H_k}{B+H_k}\right)^2-\mu H_k\theta\left(\frac{B}{B+H_k}\right)^2\Rightarrow$$

$\ddot{\theta}+\theta\left( \frac{kL_{e}^{2}+\frac{\mu BH_k}{(B+H_k)}}{mL_{e}^{2}}\right)=\ddot{\theta}+\theta\left( \omega_o^2 +\frac{\mu BH_k}{mL_{e}^{2}(B+H_k)}\right)=0,$

or

$\ddot{\theta}+\omega^2\theta=0,$	Eq. 3

where $\omega^{2}\equiv\left( \omega_o^2 +\frac{\mu BH_k}{mL_{e}^{2}(B+H_k)}\right)=\omega_o^2\left( 1 +\frac{\mu BH_k}{kL_{e}^{2}(B+H_k)}\right)$. The solution to this differential equation is $\theta(t)=c_{1}\cos\omega t+c_{2}\sin\omega t$ where $c_{1}$ and $c_{2}$ are coefficients determined by the initial conditions. The motion of a simple pendulum is similarly described by this differential equation and solution in the small angle approximation.

We can use the binomial expansion to rewrite $\omega$,

$$\omega=\omega_o\left( 1 +\frac{\mu BH_k}{kL_{e}^{2}(B+H_k)}\right)^{1/2}\approx \omega_o\left( 1 +\frac{\mu BH_k}{2kL_{e}^{2}(B+H_k)}+...\right)\Rightarrow$$

$\frac{\omega-\omega_o}{\omega_o}=\frac{\Delta \omega}{\omega_o}=\frac{\mu HH_k}{2kL_e^2(H+H_k)},$	Eq. 4

which is the form as seen in literature, for example equation 2 in the paper "Magnetic Dissipation and Fluctuations in Individual Nanomagnets Measured by Ultrasensitive Cantilever Magnetometry".
