= Spin polarization =

Degree to which a particle's spin aligns with a given direction

In particle physics, spin polarization is the degree to which the spin, i.e., the intrinsic angular momentum of elementary particles, is aligned with a given direction. This property may pertain to the spin, hence to the magnetic moment, of conduction electrons in ferromagnetic metals, such as iron, giving rise to spin-polarized currents. It may refer to (static) spin waves, preferential correlation of spin orientation with ordered lattices (semiconductors or insulators).

It may also pertain to beams of particles.

The circular polarization of electromagnetic fields is due to spin polarization of their constituent photons.

In the most generic context, spin polarization is any alignment of the components of a non-scalar (vectorial, tensorial, spinorial) field with its arguments, i.e., with the nonrelativistic three spatial or relativistic four spatiotemporal regions over which it is defined. In this sense, it also includes gravitational waves and any field theory that couples its constituents with the differential operators of vector analysis.

== Applications ==
SP has numerous potential applications.

Polarized neutron scattering or muon spin spectroscopy. Spin polarization of electrons or of nuclei, often called simply magnetization, is also produced by the application of a magnetic field. Curie law is used to produce an induction signal in electron spin resonance (ESR or EPR) and in nuclear magnetic resonance (NMR).

Spintronics is a branch of solid state electronics. Magnetic semiconductors are being researched as possible spintronic materials.

=== Fusion power ===
Spin polarization of deuterium and tritium is expected to have substantially advance fusion power towards becoming a practical technology given that aligned spins make fusion more probable. Benefits include:

- Fusion reactivity/cross-section increased as much as 50% for fully parallel D-T fuel. This is a direct quantum effect.
- Power increased by 80%–90% (or more) due to increased plasma temperature
- Electric power output as much as 2x the raw fusion increase
- Reduced tritium requirement, reducing reactor size and cost

== Measurement ==
The spin of free electrons is measured either by a low-energy electron diffraction (LEED) image from a clean tungsten crystal (SPLEED) or by an electron microscope composed of only electrostatic lenses and gold foil as a sample. Both devices work due to spin-orbit coupling.

A Mott detector uses annular optics to decelerate back-scattered electrons and focus them onto a ring shaped electron multiplier at about 15°. The position on the ring is recorded. Depending upon their spin the electrons have the chance to hit the ring at different positions. 1% of the electrons are scattered in the foil. Of these, 1% are collected by the detector while about 30% hit the detector at the wrong position.

== See also ==
- Photon polarization
- Spin angular momentum of light
- Magnetization
