= Peter Grünberg =

German physicist (1939–2018)

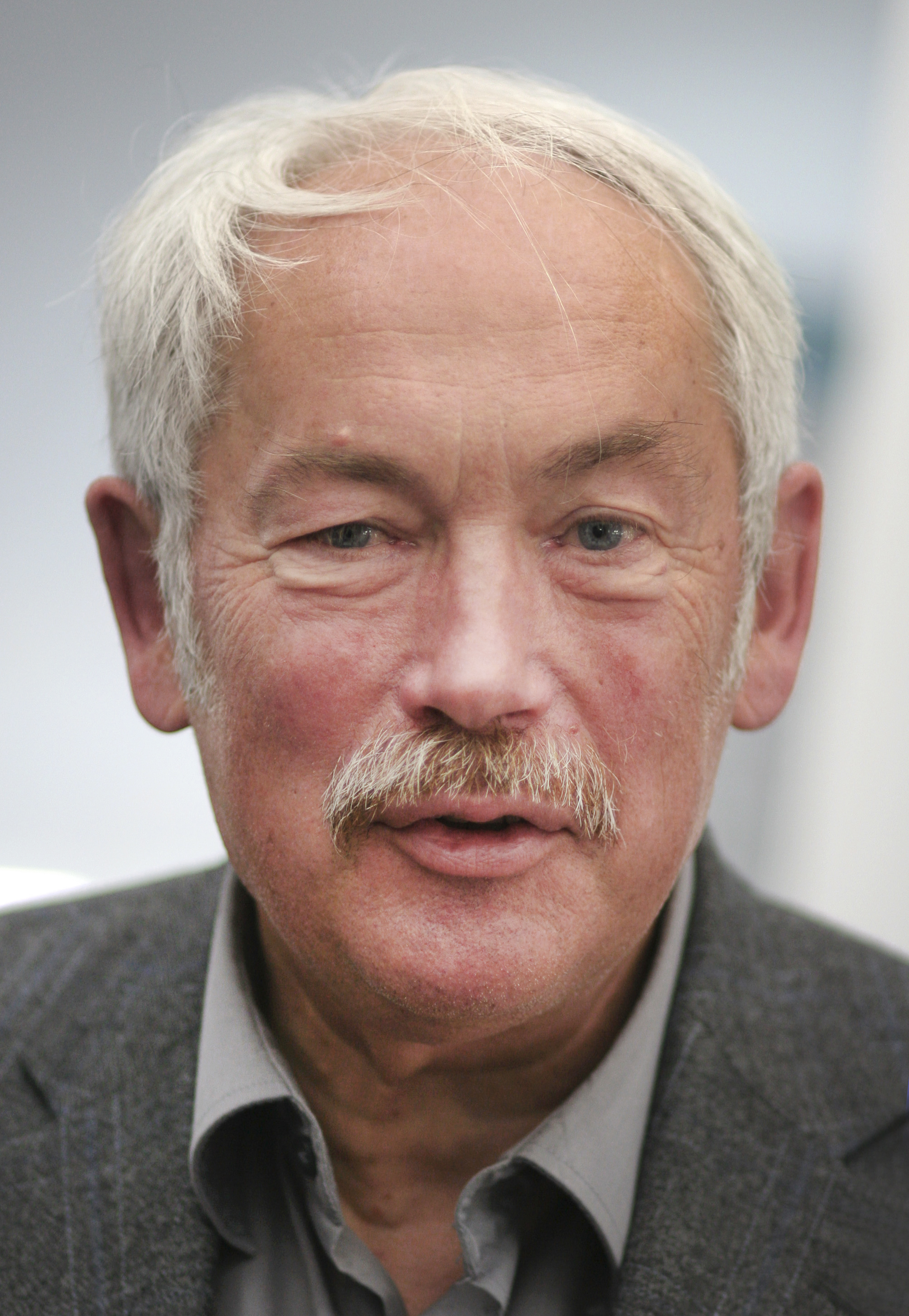
- Grünberg in 2009
- Born: Peter Andreas Grünberg; 18 May 1939; Plzeň, Bohemia and Moravia
- Died: 7 April 2018 (aged 78); Jülich, North Rhine-Westphalia, Germany
- Education: Technische Universität Darmstadt
- Known for: Discovery of giant magnetoresistance
- Awards: International Prize for New Materials (1994); German Future Prize (1998); Stern-Gerlach Medal (2006); European Inventor Award (2006); Wolf Prize in Physics (2006); Japan Prize (2007); Nobel Prize in Physics (2007); Friendship Award (China) (2016)
- Scientific career
- Fields: Physics
- Workplaces: Carleton University; Forschungszentrum Jülich; University of Cologne; Gwangju Institute of Science and Technology (GIST); Tohoku University; Argonne National Laboratories
- Doctoral advisor: Stefan Hüfner

Peter Andreas Grünberg (German: [ˈpeːtɐ ˈɡʁyːnbɛʁk]; 18 May 1939 – 7 April 2018) was a German physicist, and Nobel Prize in Physics laureate for his discovery with Albert Fert of giant magnetoresistance which brought about a breakthrough in gigabyte hard disk drives.

== Life and career ==
Grünberg was born in Plzeň, Czechoslovakia, which at the time was known as Pilsen in the German-occupied Protectorate of Bohemia and Moravia (now the Czech Republic) to the Sudeten German family of Anna and Feodor A. Grünberg. They first lived in Dýšina to the east of Plzeň. Grünberg was a Catholic.

After the war, the family was interned; the parents were brought to a camp. His father, a Russia-born engineer who since 1928 had worked for Škoda, died on 27 November 1945 in Czech imprisonment and is buried in a mass grave in Plzeň which is also inscribed with Grünberg Theodor † 27. November 1945. His mother Anna (who died in 2002 aged 100) had to work in agriculture and stayed with her parents in the Petermann house in Untersekerschan (Dolní Sekyřany), where her children (Peter's sister was born in 1937) were brought later. The remaining Grünberg family, like almost all Germans, was expelled from Czechoslovakia in 1946. Seven-year-old Peter came to Lauterbach, Hesse where he attended gymnasium.

Grünberg received his intermediate diploma in 1962 from the Johann Wolfgang Goethe University in Frankfurt. He then attended the Technische Universität Darmstadt, where he received his diploma in physics in 1966 and his doctorate in 1969. While there, he met and married his wife, Helma Prauser, who became a schoolteacher. From 1969 to 1972, he did postdoctoral work at Carleton University in Ottawa, Canada. He later joined the Institute for Solid State Physics at Forschungszentrum Jülich, Jülich, Germany, where he became a leading researcher in the field of thin film and multilayer magnetism until his retirement in 2004.

In 1984–1985 he served as visiting scientist at Argonne National Laboratories, Lemont, Illinois, USA. From 1984 to 1992 he had Habilitation process and was a lecturer (Junior Professor), and since 1992 till 2004 a Tenured Professor (ausserplanmässiger Professor) at the University of Cologne, Germany. He was also a visiting professor at the Tohoku University at Sendai-shi, Miyagi-ken, Japan from 1998 till 2004.

In 2007, Grünberg was awarded Honorary Doctorate from the RWTH Aachen University, Aachen, Germany, in 2008 Honorary Doctorate from the Saarland University, and from Gebze Institute of Technology, and in 2009 from the University of Athens.

== Important work ==
In 1986 he discovered the antiparallel exchange coupling between ferromagnetic layers separated by a thin non-ferromagnetic layer, and in 1988 he discovered the giant magnetoresistive effect (GMR). GMR was simultaneously and independently discovered by Albert Fert from the Université de Paris Sud. It has been used extensively in read heads of modern hard drives. Another application of the GMR effect is non-volatile, magnetic random access memory.

Apart from the Nobel Prize, work also has been rewarded with shared prizes in the APS International Prize for New Materials, the International Union of Pure and Applied Physics Magnetism Award, the Hewlett-Packard Europhysics Prize, the Wolf Prize in Physics and the 2007 Japan Prize. He won the German Future Prize for Technology and Innovation in 1998 and was named European Inventor of the Year in the category "Universities and research institutions" by the European Patent Office and European Commission in 2006.

== Honors and awards ==
- American Physical Society's International Prize for New Materials (1994)
- International Union of Pure and Applied Physics (IUPAP) Magnetism Award (1994)
- Hewlett-Packard Europhysics Prize (1997) with Albert Fert and Stuart Parkin
- German Future Prize for Technology and Innovation (1998)
- Max Planck Society Member (2003).
- Germany Physical Society's Stern-Gerlach Medal (2006)
- European Inventor of the Year (2006)
- Wolf Prize in Physics (2006)
- Japan Prize (2007)
- Nobel Prize in Physics (2007)
- Friendship Award (China) (2016)

== Selected publications ==
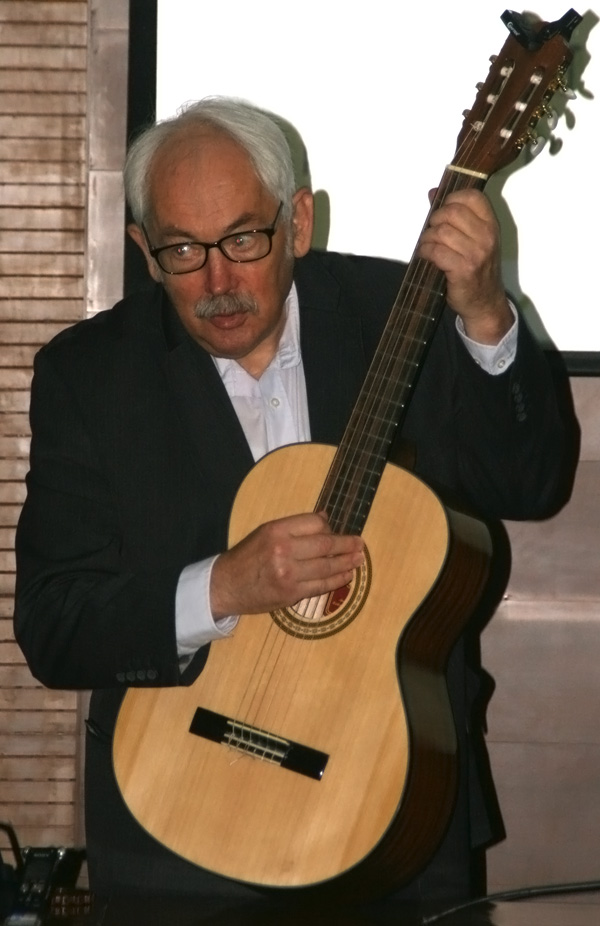
Peter Grünberg playing guitar during his speech

- DE 3820475 "Magnetfeldsensor mit ferromagnetischer, dünner Schicht" filed on 16.06.1988
- US 4949039 "Magnetic field sensor with ferromagnetic thin layers having magnetically antiparallel polarized components"
- Suzuki, Y.; Katayama, T.; Takanashi, K.; Schreiber, R.; Grünberg, P.; Tanaka, K. (1997). "The magneto-optical effect of Cr(001) wedged ultrathin films grown on Fe(001)". Journal of Magnetism and Magnetic Materials. 165 (1–3). Elsevier BV: 134–136. Bibcode:1997JMMM..165..134S. doi:10.1016/s0304-8853(96)00488-x. ISSN 0304-8853.
- Grünberg, P.; Wolf, J.A.; Schäfer, R. (1996). "Long-range exchange interactions in epitaxial layered magnetic structures". Physica B: Condensed Matter. 221 (1–4). Elsevier BV: 357–365. Bibcode:1996PhyB..221..357G. doi:10.1016/0921-4526(95)00949-3. ISSN 0921-4526.
- M. Schäfer, Q. Leng, R. Schreiber, K. Takanashi, P. Grünberg, W. Zinn. 1995. "Experiments on Interlayer Exchange Coupling" (invited at 5th NEC Symp., Karuizawa, Japan). J. of Mat. Sci. and Eng. . B31, 17.
- Fert, A.; Grünberg, P.; Barthélémy, A.; Petroff, F.; Zinn, W. (1995). "Layered magnetic structures: interlayer exchange coupling and giant magnetoresistance". Journal of Magnetism and Magnetic Materials. 140–144. Elsevier BV: 1–8. Bibcode:1995JMMM..140....1F. doi:10.1016/0304-8853(94)00880-9. ISSN 0304-8853.
- Grünberg, P. A.; Fuss, A.; Leng, Q.; Schreiber, R.; Wolf, J. A. (1993). "Interlayer Coupling and its Relation to Growth and Structure". Magnetism and Structure in Systems of Reduced Dimension. NATO ASI Series. Vol. 309. Boston, MA: Springer US. pp. 87–100. doi:10.1007/978-1-4899-1519-1_9. ISBN 978-1-4899-1521-4. ISSN 0258-1221.
- Fuß, A.; Demokritov, S.; Grünberg, P.; Zinn, W. (1992). "Short- and long period oscillations in the exchange coupling of Fe across epitaxially grown Al- and Au-interlayers". Journal of Magnetism and Magnetic Materials. 103 (3). Elsevier BV: L221–L227. Bibcode:1992JMMM..103L.221F. doi:10.1016/0304-8853(92)90192-q. ISSN 0304-8853.
- Binasch, G.; Grünberg, P.; Saurenbach, F.; Zinn, W. (1989). "Enhanced magnetoresistance in layered magnetic structures with antiferromagnetic interlayer exchange". Physical Review B. 39 (7): 4828–4830. Bibcode:1989PhRvB..39.4828B. doi:10.1103/PhysRevB.39.4828. PMID 9948867.
- Grünberg, P.; Schreiber, R.; Pang, Y.; Brodsky, M. B.; Sowers, H. (10 November 1986). "Layered Magnetic Structures: Evidence for Antiferromagnetic Coupling of Fe Layers across Cr Interlayers". Physical Review Letters. 57 (19). American Physical Society (APS): 2442–2445. Bibcode:1986PhRvL..57.2442G. doi:10.1103/physrevlett.57.2442. ISSN 0031-9007. PMID 10033726.
