= Magnonics =

Subfield of magnetism

Magnonics is an emerging field of modern magnetism, which can be considered a subfield of modern solid-state physics. Magnonics combines the study of waves and magnetism. Its main aim is to investigate the behaviour of spin waves in nano-structured elements. In essence, spin waves are a propagating re-ordering of the magnetisation in a material and arise from the precession of magnetic moments. Magnetic moments arise from the orbital and spin moments of the electron; most often, it is this spin moment that contributes to the net magnetic moment.

Following the success of the modern hard disk, there is significant current interest in future magnetic data storage and using spin waves for things such as 'magnonic' logic and data storage. Similarly, spintronics aims to utilize the inherent spin degree of freedom to complement the already successful charge property of the electron used in contemporary electronics. Modern magnetism is concerned with deepening the understanding of the behaviour of the magnetisation on very small (sub-micrometre) length scales and very fast (sub-nanosecond) timescales, and how this can be applied to improving existing or generating new technologies and computing concepts. A magnon torque device was invented and later perfected at the National University of Singapore's Electrical & Computer Engineering department, which is based on such potential uses, with results published on November 29, 2019, in Science.

A magnonic crystal is a magnetic metamaterial with alternating magnetic properties. Like conventional metamaterials, their properties arise from geometrical structuring, rather than their band structure or composition directly. Small spatial inhomogeneities create an effective macroscopic behaviour, leading to properties not readily found in nature. By alternating parameters such as the relative permeability or saturation magnetisation, there exists the possibility to tailor 'magnonic' band gaps in the material. By tuning the size of this bandgap, only spin wave modes able to cross the bandgap would be able to propagate through the media, leading to the selective propagation of certain spin wave frequencies. See Surface magnon polariton.

== Theory ==
Spin waves can propagate in magnetic media with magnetic ordering, such as ferromagnets and antiferromagnets. The frequencies of the precession of the magnetisation depend on the material and its magnetic parameters. In general, precession frequencies are in the microwave from 1–100 GHz, exchange resonances in particular materials can even see frequencies up to several THz. This higher precision frequency opens new possibilities for analogue and digital signal processing.

Spin waves themselves have group velocities on the order of a few km per second. The damping of spin waves in a magnetic material also causes the amplitude of the spin wave to decay with distance, meaning the distance freely propagating spin waves can travel is usually only several 10's of μm. The damping of the dynamical magnetisation is accounted for phenomenologically by the Gilbert damping constant in the Landau–Lifshitz–Gilbert equation (LLG equation), the energy loss mechanism itself is not completely understood, but is known to arise microscopically from magnon–magnon scattering, magnon–phonon scattering, and losses due to eddy currents. The Landau–Lifshitz–Gilbert equation is the 'equation of motion' for the magnetisation. All of the properties of the magnetic systems, such as the applied bias field, the sample's exchange, anisotropy, and dipolar fields, are described in terms of an 'effective' magnetic field that enters the Landau–Lifshitz–Gilbert equation. The study of damping in magnetic systems is an ongoing modern research topic. The LL equation was introduced in 1935 by Landau and Lifshitz to model the precessional motion of magnetization $\mathbf{M}$ in a solid with an effective magnetic field $\mathbf{H}_\mathrm{eff}$ and with damping. Later, Gilbert modified the damping term, which in the limit of small damping yields identical results. The LLG equation is,

$$\frac{\partial \textbf m}{\partial t}\, =\, -\gamma \,\textbf m\times \textbf{H}_{\mathrm{eff}}\, +\, \alpha\,\textbf m\times\frac{\partial \textbf m}{\partial t}\,.\qquad$$

The constant $\alpha$ is the Gilbert phenomenological damping parameter and depends on the solid, and $\gamma$ is the electron gyromagnetic ratio. Here $\textbf m={\textbf M}/{\mathrm M_S}$.

Theoretical research in magnonics focuses primarily on numerical modelling and simulations, so called micromagnetic modelling. Programs such as OOMMF, NMAG, or mumax3, are micromagnetic solvers that numerically solve the LLG equation with appropriate boundary conditions. Prior to the start of the simulation, the magnetic parameters of the sample and the initial ground-state magnetisation and bias-field details are stated.

== Experiment ==
Experimentally, there are many techniques that exist to study magnetic phenomena, each with its own limitations and advantages. The experimental techniques can be distinguished by being time-domain (optical and field pumped TR-MOKE), field-domain (ferromagnetic resonance (FMR)) and frequency-domain techniques (Brillouin light scattering (BLS), vector network analyser – ferromagnetic resonance (VNA-FMR)). Time-domain techniques allow the temporal evolution of the magnetisation to be traced indirectly by recording the polarisation response of the sample. The magnetisation can be inferred by the so-called 'Kerr' rotation. Field-domain techniques such as FMR tickle the magnetisation with a CW microwave field. By measuring the absorption of the microwave radiation through the sample, as an external magnetic field is swept provides information about magnetic resonances in the sample. Importantly, the frequency at which the magnetisation processes depends on the strength of the applied magnetic field. As the external field strength is increased, so does the precession frequency. Frequency-domain techniques, such as VNA-FMR, examine the magnetic response due to excitation by an RF current, the frequency of the current is swept through the GHz range, and the amplitude of either the transmitted or reflected current can be measured.

Modern ultrafast lasers allow femtosecond (fs) temporal resolution for time-domain techniques, such tools are now standard in laboratory environments. Based on the magneto-optic Kerr effect, TR-MOKE is a pump-probe technique where a pulsed laser source illuminates the sample with two separate laser beams. The 'pump' beam is designed to excite or perturb the sample from equilibrium, it is very intense designed to create highly non-equilibrium conditions within the sample material, exciting the electron, and thereby subsequently the phonon and the spin system. Spin-wave states at high energy are excited and subsequently populate the lower lying states during their relaxation path's. A much weaker beam called a 'probe' beam is spatially overlapped with the pump beam on the magnonic material's surface. The probe beam is passed along a delay line, which is a mechanical way of increasing the probe path length. By increasing the probe path length, it becomes delayed with respect to the pump beam and arrives at a later time on the sample surface. Time-resolution is built in the experiment by changing the delay distance. As the delay line position is stepped, the reflected beam properties are measured. The measured Kerr rotation is proportional to the dynamic magnetisation as the spin-waves propagate in the media. The temporal resolution is limited by the temporal width of the laser pulse only. This allows to connect ultrafast optics with a local spin-wave excitation and contact free detection in magnonic metamaterials, photomagnonics.

== Conferences ==
Magnonics is often discussed within a larger context of magnetization dynamics, and the relevant research is presented within a dedicated section of magnetism conferences. However, specialized conferences are also organized. They include, for example, "Magnonics" conference that is organised every second year, and the "TRTM" conference organized every year.
