= Spin stiffness =

The spin stiffness or spin rigidity is a constant which represents the change in the ground state energy of a spin system as a result of introducing a slow in-plane twist of the spins. The importance of this constant is in its use as an indicator of quantum phase transitions—specifically in models with metal-insulator transitions such as Mott insulators. It is also related to other topological invariants such as the Berry phase and Chern numbers as in the quantum Hall effect.

== Mathematically ==
Mathematically it can be defined by the following equation:

$$\rho_s = \cfrac{\partial^2}{\partial \theta^2}\cfrac{E_0(\theta)}{N}|_{\theta = 0}$$

where $E_0$ is the ground state energy, $\theta$ is the twisting angle, and N is the number of lattice sites.

== Spin stiffness of the Heisenberg model ==
Start off with the simple Heisenberg spin Hamiltonian:

$$H_\mathrm{Heisenberg} = -J \sum_{<i,j>} \left[S_i^z S_j^z + \cfrac{1}{2}(S_i^+ S_j^- + S_i^- S_j^+)\right]$$

Now we introduce a rotation in the system at site i by an angle θ_{i} around the z-axis:

$$S_i^+ \longrightarrow S_i^+e^{i \theta_i}$$
$$S_i^- \longrightarrow S_i^-e^{-i \theta_i}$$

Plugging these back into the Heisenberg Hamiltonian:

$$H(\theta_{ij}) = -J \sum_{<i,j>} \left[S_i^z S_j^z + \cfrac{1}{2}(S_i^+e^{i\theta_i} S_j^-e^{-i\theta_j} + S_i^-e^{-i\theta_i} S_j^+e^{i\theta_j})\right]$$

now let θ_{ij} = θ_{i} - θ_{j} and expand around θ_{ij} = 0 via a MacLaurin expansion only keeping terms up to second order in θ_{ij}

$$H \approx H_\mathrm{Heisenberg} - J \sum_{<ij>} \left[\theta_{ij}J_{ij}^{(s)} - \cfrac{1}{2}\theta_{ij}^2 T_{ij}^{(s)}\right]$$

where the first term is independent of θ and the second term is a perturbation for small θ.

$J_{ij}^{s} = \cfrac{i}{2}(S_i^+ S_j^- - S_i^- S_j^+)$ is the z-component of the spin current operator
$T_{ij} = \cfrac{1}{2}(S_i^+ S_j^- + S_i^- S_j^+)$ is the "spin kinetic energy"

Consider now the case of identical twists, θ_{x} only that exist along nearest neighbor bonds along the x-axis. Then since the spin stiffness is related to the difference in the ground state energy by

$$E(\theta) - E(0) = N\rho_s\theta_x^2$$

then for small θ_{x} and with the help of second order perturbation theory we get:

$$\rho_s = \cfrac{1}{N} \left[ \cfrac{1}{2}\langle T_x \rangle + \sum_{\nu \neq 0} \cfrac{ | \langle 0| j_x^{(s)}|\nu\rangle |^2 }{E_{\nu} - E_0}\right]$$

== See also ==
- Spin wave
