= Spin-polarized electron energy loss spectroscopy =

Spin-polarized electron energy loss spectroscopy or SPEELS is a technique mainly used to measure the dispersion relation of the collective excitations, over the whole Brillouin zone.

Spin waves are collective perturbations in a magnetic solid. Their properties depend on their wavelength (or wave vector). For long wavelength (short wave vector) spin waves, the resulting spin precession has a very low frequency and the spin waves can be treated classically. Ferromagnetic resonance (FMR) and Brillouin light scattering (BLS) experiments explain the long wavelength spin waves in ultrathin magnetic films and nanostructures. If the wavelength is comparable to the lattice constant, the spin waves are governed by the microscopic exchange coupling and a quantum mechanical description is needed. Therefore, experimental information on these short wavelength (large wave vector) spin waves in ultrathin films is highly desired and may lead to fundamentally new insights into the spin dynamics in reduced dimensions in the future.

SPEELS is one of the few techniques that can be used to measure the dispersion of such short wavelength spin waves in ultrathin films and nanostructures.

== The first experiment ==
For the first time Kirschner's group in Max Planck institute of Microstructure Physics showed that the signature of the large wave vector spin waves can be detected by spin polarized electron energy loss spectroscopy (SPEELS). Later, with a better momentum resolution, the spin wave dispersion was fully measured in 8 monolayer (ML) fcc cobalt film on Cu(001) and 8 ML hcp cobalt on W(110), respectively. Those spin waves were obtained up to the surface Brillouin zone (SBZ) at the energy range about few hundreds of meV. Another recent example is the investigation of 1 and 2 monolayer iron films grown on W(110) measured at 120 K and 300 K, respectively.
