= Supriyo Datta =

Indian-American scientist and educator

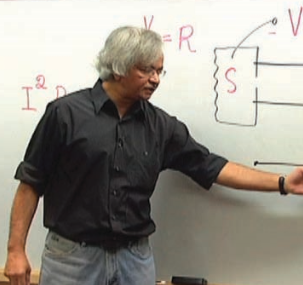
- Born: February 2, 1954 (age 72); Dibrugarh, Assam, India
- Education: IIT Kharagpur (BTech); University of Illinois at Urbana–Champaign (MS, PhD)
- Known for: spin transistor non-equilibrium Green function negative capacitance p-Bits
- Awards: Presidential Young Investigator Award; IEEE Leon K. Kirchmayer Award; Frederick Terman Award; IEEE Cledo Brunetti Award; Procter Prize
- Scientific career
- Fields: Quantum transport Mesoscopic physics
- Workplaces: Purdue University
- Thesis: Theory of guided acoustic waves in piezoelectric solids (1979)
- Doctoral advisor: Bill J. Hunsinger
- Doctoral students: Manoj Samanta

Signature
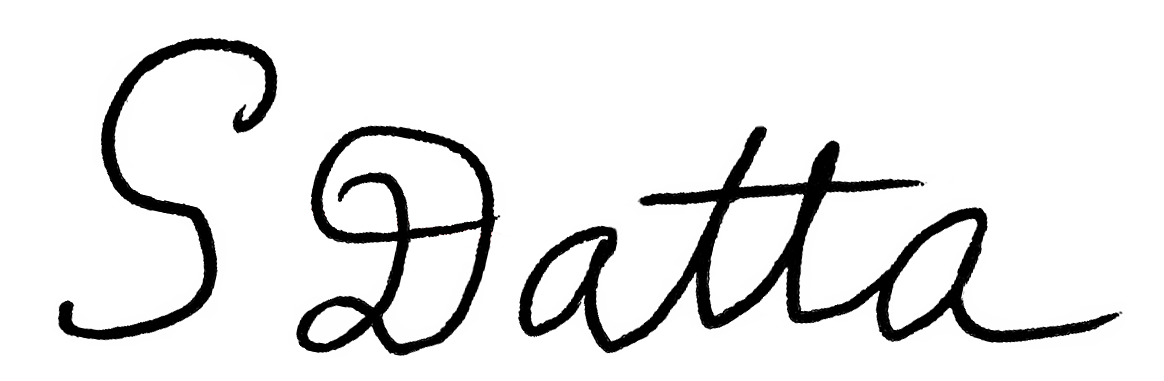

Supriyo Datta (born February 2, 1954) is an Indian–American researcher and author. A leading figure in the modeling and understanding of nano-scale electronic conduction, he has been called "one of the most original thinkers in the field of nanoscale electronics."

As an author, his books and online courses are widely used as original research and design work in the field of nanotechnology and electronic devices. He is known for the development of the spin transistor, the non-equilibrium Green's function method for quantum transport and negative capacitances.

== Biography ==
Supriyo Datta was born in Dibrugarh, India in 1954.

Datta received his B.Tech from the Indian Institute of Technology (IIT) in Kharagpur, India in 1975. He then received both his MS and PhD from the University of Illinois Urbana–Champaign in 1977 and 1979, respectively. His PhD thesis was titled Theory of guided acoustic waves in piezoelectric solids.

In 1981, he joined Purdue University, where he is (since 1999) the Thomas Duncan Distinguished Professor in the School of Electrical Engineering. He was also director of the NASA Institute for Nanoelectronics and Computing until 2007.

== Research ==
Before 1985, he worked in the field of surface acoustics. Since 1985 he has focused on nanoscale electronic devices and has contributed through his foundational work on quantum transport, spintronics and negative capacitance electronics. He has also worked on probabilistic p-bits.

=== Quantum transport ===
In a series of papers between 1985 and 1995 his group demonstrated how the non-equilibrium Green's function (NEGF) formalism used by many-body physicists for uniform conductors could be extended to model electronic devices which are non-uniform and have contacts. He made this work broadly accessible through his book Electronic Transport in Mesoscopic Physics.

Between 1995 and 2005 his group combined his earlier NEGF approach with an atomistic Hamiltonian, to establish a conceptual and computational framework that is used by quantum chemists in molecular electronics, and is also the basis for modern quantum transport simulation tools routinely used in the semiconductor industry.

Between 2005 and 2015 his group developed approaches for analyzing spin-based devices and circuits that incorporate them.

=== Spintronics ===
In 1990 he proposed the spin transistor, using spin-orbit coupling to control electron spin with an electric field rather than a magnetic field. This was experimentally demonstrated in 1997 and is widely used in the field of spintronics. This "proposal planted the idea that spin could be used in its own right as a means to carry and manipulate information — and gave birth to the new field of spintronics."

=== Negative capacitance electronics ===
In 2008, along with Sayeef Salahuddin he proposed the concept of negative capacitance devices, which is now considered a prime candidate for reducing dissipation and extending Moore's law.

== Honours and awards ==
Datta received the President of India Gold Medal at graduation from IIT Kharagpur in 1975.

He received the Frederick Emmons Terman Award from the American Society of Engineering Education in 1994 for his book on surface acoustics, and the Presidential Young Investigator Award from the National Science Foundation, 1984.

He is included in Purdue's Book of Great Teachers and won the 2006 Herbert Newby McCoy Award, the 2018 Seed for Award and the 2020 Morrill Award given by Purdue University.

In 1996, he became both Fellow of the American Physical Society (APS) as well as of the Institute of Electrical and Electronics Engineers (IEEE). He has received various IEEE awards including: the 1985 IEEE Centennial Key to the Future, the 2002 IEEE Cledo Brunetti Award, and the 2008 IEEE Leon Kirchmayer Award.

In 2011, he received the William Procter Prize for Scientific Achievement.

In 2012, he was elected as a member into the National Academy of Engineering (NAE) for quantum transport modeling in nanoscale electronic devices.

In 2024, he was elected as a member into the National Academy of Sciences.

== Books ==
- Datta, Supriyo (1986). Surface acoustic wave devices. Englewood Cliffs, N.J: Prentice-Hall. ISBN 978-0-13-877911-5.
- Datta, Supriyo (1989). Quantum phenomena. Modular series on solid state devices (Repr. with corr ed.). Reading, Mass.: Addison-Wesley. ISBN 978-0-201-07956-2.
- Datta, Supriyo (1995). Electronic transport in mesoscopic systems. Cambridge: Cambridge University Press. ISBN 978-0-521-59943-6.
- Datta, Supriyo (2005). Quantum transport: atom to transistor. Cambridge New York Melbourne: Cambridge University Press. ISBN 978-0-521-63145-7.
- Datta, Supriyo (2012). Lessons from nanoelectronics: a new perspective on transport. Part A: Basis concepts. World Scientific. ISBN 978-981-4335-28-7.
