= Spin transistor =

Potential transistor-like device

The magnetically sensitive transistor, also known as the spin transistor, spin field-effect transistor (spinFET), Datta–Das spin transistor or spintronic transistor (named for spintronics, the technology which this development spawned), originally proposed in 1990 by Supriyo Datta and Biswajit Das, is an alternative design on the common transistor invented in the 1940s. This device was considered one of the Nature milestones in spin in 2008. A new all-electric all-semiconductor design was later developed as an alternative approach to realizing spin transistor functionality in a CMOS-compatible platform.

== Description ==
The spin transistor comes about as a result of research on the ability of electrons (and other fermions) to naturally exhibit one of two (and only two) states of spin: known as "spin up" and "spin down". Thus, spin transistors operate on electron spin as embodying a two-state quantum system. Unlike its namesake predecessor, which operates on an electric current, spin transistors operate on electrons on a more fundamental level; it is essentially the application of electrons set in particular states of spin to store information.

One advantage over regular transistors is that these spin states can be detected and altered without necessarily requiring the application of an electric current. This allows for detection hardware (such as disk read-and-write heads) that are much smaller but even more sensitive than today's devices, which rely on noisy amplifiers to detect the minute charges used on today's data storage devices. The potential result is devices that can store more data in less space and consume less power, using less costly materials. The increased sensitivity of spin transistors is also being researched in creating more sensitive automotive sensors, a move being encouraged by a push for environmentally friendlier vehicles.

A second advantage of a spin transistor is that the spin of an electron is semi-permanent and can be used as means of creating cost-effective non-volatile solid state storage that does not require the constant application of current to sustain. It is one of the technologies being explored for magnetic random access memory (MRAM).

Because of its high potential for practical use in the computer world, spin transistors are currently being researched in various firms throughout the world, such as in England and in Sweden. By the mid‑2010s, several breakthroughs had enabled the fabrication the production of spin transistors, using readily available substances (e.g., carbon nanotubes), that can operate at room temperature: a precursor to commercial viability.
