= Spin (physics) =

Intrinsic quantum property of particles

Spin is an intrinsic form of angular momentum carried by elementary particles, and thus by composite particles such as hadrons, atomic nuclei, and atoms. Spin is quantized, and accurate models for the interaction with spin require relativistic quantum mechanics or quantum field theory.

The existence of electron spin angular momentum is inferred from experiments, such as the Stern–Gerlach experiment, in which silver atoms were observed to possess two possible discrete angular momenta despite having no orbital angular momentum. The relativistic spin–statistics theorem connects electron spin quantization to the Pauli exclusion principle: observations of exclusion imply half-integer spin, and observations of half-integer spin imply exclusion.

Spin is described mathematically as a vector for some particles such as photons, and as a spinor for other particles such as electrons. Spinors behave similarly to vectors: they have definite magnitudes and change under rotations; however, they use an unconventional "direction". All elementary particles of a given kind have the same magnitude of spin angular momentum, though its direction may change. These are indicated by assigning the particle a spin quantum number.

The SI units of spin are the same as classical angular momentum (i.e., N·m·s, J·s, or kg·m^{2}·s^{−1}). In quantum mechanics, angular momentum and spin angular momentum take discrete values proportional to the Planck constant. In practice, spin is usually given as a dimensionless spin quantum number by dividing the spin angular momentum by the reduced Planck constant ħ. Often, the "spin quantum number" is simply called "spin".

== Models ==
=== Rotating charged mass ===
The earliest models for electron spin imagined a rotating charged mass, but this model fails when examined in detail. The required space distribution does not match limits on the electron radius, and the required rotation speed exceeds the speed of light. In the Standard Model, the fundamental particles are all considered "point-like", and they have their effects through the field that surrounds them. Any model for spin based on mass rotation would need to be consistent with that model.

=== Pauli's "classically non-describable two-valuedness" ===
Wolfgang Pauli, a central figure in the history of quantum spin, initially rejected any idea that the "degree of freedom" he introduced to explain experimental observations was related to rotation. He called it "classically non-describable two-valuedness". Later, he allowed that it is related to angular momentum, but insisted on considering spin an abstract property. This approach allowed Pauli to develop a proof of his fundamental Pauli exclusion principle, a proof now called the spin-statistics theorem. In retrospect, this insistence and the style of his proof initiated the modern particle-physics era, where abstract quantum properties derived from symmetry properties dominate. Concrete interpretation became secondary and optional.

=== Circulation of classical fields ===
The first classical model for spin proposed a small rigid particle rotating about an axis, as ordinary use of the word may suggest. Angular momentum can be computed from a classical field as well. By applying Frederik Belinfante's approach to calculating the angular momentum of a field, Hans C. Ohanian showed that "spin is essentially a wave property ... generated by a circulating flow of charge in the wave field of the electron". This same concept of spin can be applied to gravity waves in water: "spin is generated by subwavelength circular motion of water particles".

Unlike classical wavefield circulation, which allows continuous values of angular momentum, quantum wavefields allow only discrete values. Consequently, energy transfer to or from spin states always occurs in fixed quantum steps. Only a few steps are allowed: for many qualitative purposes, the complexity of the spin quantum wavefields can be ignored and the system properties can be discussed in terms of "integer" or "half-integer" spin models as discussed in quantum numbers below.

=== In Bohmian mechanics ===
Spin can be understood differently depending on the interpretations of quantum mechanics. In the de Broglie–Bohm interpretation, particles have definitive trajectories but their motion is driven by the wave function or pilot wave. In this interpretation, the spin is a property of the pilot wave and not of the particle itself.

=== Dirac's relativistic electron ===
Relativistic calculations of spin properties for electrons requires the Dirac equation.

== Relation to orbital angular momentum ==
As the name suggests, spin was originally conceived as the rotation of a particle around some axis. Historically orbital angular momentum related to particle orbits. While the names based on mechanical models have survived, the physical explanation has not. Quantization fundamentally alters the character of both spin and orbital angular momentum.

Since elementary particles are point-like, self-rotation is not well-defined for them. However, spin implies that the phase of the particle depends on the angle as $e^{i S \theta}\ ,$ for rotation of angle θ around the axis parallel to the spin S. This is equivalent to the quantum-mechanical interpretation of momentum as phase dependence in the position, and of orbital angular momentum as phase dependence in the angular position.

For fermions, the picture is less clear: From the Ehrenfest theorem, the angular velocity is equal to the derivative of the Hamiltonian to its conjugate momentum, which is the total angular momentum operator J = L + S . Therefore, if the Hamiltonian H has any dependence on the spin S, then (∂ H)/( ∂ S ) must be non-zero; consequently, for classical mechanics, the existence of spin in the Hamiltonian will produce an actual angular velocity, and hence an actual physical rotation – that is, a change in the phase-angle, θ, over time. However, whether this holds true for free electrons is ambiguous, since for an electron, | S |² is a constant 1/ 2 ℏ , and one might decide that since it cannot change, no partial (∂) can exist. Therefore it is a matter of interpretation whether the Hamiltonian must include such a term, and whether this aspect of classical mechanics extends into quantum mechanics (any particle's intrinsic spin angular momentum, S, is a quantum number arising from a "spinor" in the mathematical solution to the Dirac equation, rather than being a more nearly physical quantity, like orbital angular momentum L). Nevertheless, spin appears in the Dirac equation, and thus the relativistic Hamiltonian of the electron, treated as a Dirac field, can be interpreted as including a dependence in the spin S.

== Quantum number ==
Spin obeys the mathematical laws of angular momentum quantization. The specific properties of spin angular momenta include:

- Spin quantum numbers may take either half-integer or integer values.
- Although the direction of its spin can be changed, the magnitude of the spin of an elementary particle cannot be changed.
- The spin of a charged particle is associated with a magnetic dipole moment with a g-factor that differs from 1. (In the classical context, this would imply the internal charge and mass distributions differing for a rotating nonconductive object.)

The conventional definition of the spin quantum number is s = n/2, where n can be any non-negative integer. Hence the allowed values of s are 0, 1/2, 1, 3/2, 2, etc. The value of s for an elementary particle depends only on the type of particle and cannot be altered in any known way (in contrast to the spin direction described below). The spin angular momentum S of any physical system is quantized. The allowed values of S are
$$S = \hbar \, \sqrt{s(s + 1)} = \frac{h}{2\pi} \, \sqrt{\frac{n}{2}\frac{(n + 2)}{2}} = \frac{h}{4\pi} \, \sqrt{n(n + 2)},$$
where h is the Planck constant, and $\hbar = \frac{h}{2\pi}$ is the reduced Planck constant. In contrast, orbital angular momentum can only take on integer values of s; i.e., even-numbered values of n.

=== Fermions and bosons ===
Those particles with half-integer spins, such as 1/2, 3/2, 5/2, are known as fermions, while those particles with integer spins, such as 0, 1, 2, are known as bosons. The two families of particles obey different rules and broadly have different roles in the world around us. A key distinction between the two families is that fermions obey the Pauli exclusion principle: that is, there cannot be two identical fermions simultaneously having the same quantum numbers (meaning, roughly, having the same position, velocity and spin direction). Fermions obey the rules of Fermi–Dirac statistics. In contrast, bosons obey the rules of Bose–Einstein statistics and have no such restriction, so they may "bunch together" in identical states. Also, composite particles can have spins different from their component particles. For example, a helium-4 atom in the ground state has spin 0 and behaves like a boson, even though the quarks and electrons which make it up are all fermions.

This has some profound consequences:

- Quarks and leptons (including electrons and neutrinos), which make up what is classically known as matter, are all fermions with spin 1/2. The common idea that "matter takes up space" actually comes from the Pauli exclusion principle acting on these particles to prevent the fermions from being in the same quantum state. Further compaction would require electrons to occupy the same energy states, and therefore a kind of pressure (sometimes known as degeneracy pressure of electrons) acts to resist the fermions being overly close.
  Elementary fermions with other spins (3/2, 5/2, etc.) are not known to exist.
- Elementary particles which are thought of as carrying forces are all bosons with spin 1. They include the photon, which carries the electromagnetic force, the gluon (strong force), and the W and Z bosons (weak force). The ability of bosons to occupy the same quantum state is used in the laser, which aligns many photons having the same quantum number (the same direction and frequency), superfluid liquid helium resulting from helium-4 atoms being bosons, and superconductivity, where pairs of electrons (which individually are fermions) act as single composite bosons.
  Elementary bosons with other spins (0, 2, 3, etc.) were not historically known to exist, although they have received considerable theoretical treatment and are well established within their respective mainstream theories. In particular, theoreticians have proposed the graviton (predicted to exist by some quantum gravity theories) with spin 2, and the Higgs boson (explaining electroweak symmetry breaking) with spin 0. Since 2013, the Higgs boson with spin 0 has been considered proven to exist. It is the first scalar elementary particle (spin 0) known to exist in nature.
- Atomic nuclei have nuclear spin which may be either half-integer or integer, so that the nuclei may be either fermions or bosons.

=== Spin–statistics theorem ===
The spin–statistics theorem splits particles into two groups: bosons and fermions, where bosons obey Bose–Einstein statistics, and fermions obey Fermi–Dirac statistics (and therefore the Pauli exclusion principle). Specifically, the theorem requires that particles with half-integer spins obey the Pauli exclusion principle while particles with integer spin do not. As an example, electrons have half-integer spin and are fermions that obey the Pauli exclusion principle, while photons have integer spin and do not. The theorem was derived by Wolfgang Pauli in 1940; it relies on both quantum mechanics and the theory of special relativity. Pauli described this connection between spin and statistics as "one of the most important applications of the special relativity theory".

== Magnetic moments ==
Schematic diagram depicting the spin of the neutron as the black arrow and magnetic field lines associated with the neutron magnetic moment. The neutron has a negative magnetic moment. While the spin of the neutron is upward in this diagram, the magnetic field lines at the center of the dipole are downward.

Particles with spin can possess a magnetic dipole moment, just like a rotating electrically charged body in classical electrodynamics. These magnetic moments can be experimentally observed in several ways, e.g. by the deflection of particles by inhomogeneous magnetic fields in a Stern–Gerlach experiment, or by measuring the magnetic fields generated by the particles themselves.

The intrinsic magnetic moment μ of a spin-1/2 particle with charge q, mass m, and spin angular momentum S is

$$\boldsymbol{\mu} = \frac{g_\text{s} q}{2m} \mathbf{S},$$

where the dimensionless quantity g_{s} is called the spin g-factor. For exclusively orbital rotations, it would be 1 (assuming that the mass and the charge occupy spheres of equal radius).

The electron, being a charged elementary particle, possesses a nonzero magnetic moment. One of the triumphs of the theory of quantum electrodynamics is its accurate prediction of the electron g-factor, which has been experimentally determined to have the value −2.00231930436092(36), with the digits in parentheses denoting measurement uncertainty in the last two digits at one standard deviation. The value of 2 arises from the Dirac equation, a fundamental equation connecting the electron's spin with its electromagnetic properties; and the deviation from 2 arises from the electron's interaction with the surrounding quantum fields, including its own electromagnetic field and virtual particles.

Composite particles also possess magnetic moments associated with their spin. In particular, the neutron possesses a non-zero magnetic moment despite being electrically neutral. This fact was an early indication that the neutron is not an elementary particle. In fact, it is made up of quarks, which are electrically charged particles. The magnetic moment of the neutron comes from the spins of the individual quarks and their orbital motions.

Neutrinos are both elementary and electrically neutral. The minimally extended Standard Model that takes into account non-zero neutrino masses predicts neutrino magnetic moments of:

$$\mu_\nu \approx 3 \times 10^{-19} \mu_\text{B} \frac{m_\nu c^2}{\text{eV}},$$

where the μ_{ν} are the neutrino magnetic moments, m_{ν} are the neutrino masses, and μ_{B} is the Bohr magneton. New physics above the electroweak scale could, however, lead to significantly higher neutrino magnetic moments. It can be shown in a model-independent way that neutrino magnetic moments larger than about 10^{−14} μ_{B} are "unnatural" because they would also lead to large radiative contributions to the neutrino mass. Since the neutrino masses are known to be at most about 1 eV/c^{2}, fine-tuning would be necessary in order to prevent large contributions to the neutrino mass via radiative corrections. The measurement of neutrino magnetic moments is an active area of research. Experimental results have put the neutrino magnetic moment at less than 1.2×10^{−10} times the electron's magnetic moment.

On the other hand, elementary particles with spin but without electric charge, such as the photon and Z boson, do not have a magnetic moment.

== Direction ==
=== Spin projection quantum number and multiplicity ===
In classical mechanics, the angular momentum of a particle possesses not only a magnitude (how fast the body is rotating), but also a direction (either up or down on the axis of rotation of the particle). Quantum-mechanical spin also contains information about direction, but in a more subtle form. Quantum mechanics states that the component of angular momentum for a spin-s particle measured along any direction can only take on the values

$$S_i = \hbar s_i, \quad s_i \in \{ -s, -(s - 1), \dots, s - 1, s \},$$

where S_{i} is the spin component along the i-th axis (either x, y, or z), s_{i} is the spin projection quantum number along the i-th axis, and s is the principal spin quantum number (discussed in the previous section). Conventionally the direction chosen is the z axis:

$$S_z = \hbar s_z, \quad s_z \in \{ -s, -(s - 1), \dots, s - 1, s \},$$

where S_{z} is the spin component along the z axis, s_{z} is the spin projection quantum number along the z axis.

One can see that there are 2s + 1 possible values of s_{z}. The number "2s + 1" is the multiplicity of the spin system. For example, there are only two possible values for a spin-1/2 particle: s_{z} = +1/2 and s_{z} = −1/2. These correspond to quantum states in which the spin component is pointing in the +z or −z directions respectively, and are often referred to as "spin up" and "spin down". For a spin-3/2 particle, like a delta baryon, the possible values are +3/2, +1/2, −1/2, −3/2.

=== Vector ===
For a given quantum state, one could think of a spin vector $\lang S \rang$ whose components are the expectation values of the spin components along each axis, i.e., $\lang S \rang = [\lang S_x \rang, \lang S_y \rang, \lang S_z \rang]$. This vector then would describe the "direction" in which the spin is pointing, corresponding to the classical concept of the axis of rotation. It turns out that the spin vector is not very useful in actual quantum-mechanical calculations, because it cannot be measured directly: s_{x}, s_{y} and s_{z} cannot possess simultaneous definite values, because of a quantum uncertainty relation between them. However, for statistically large collections of particles that have been placed in the same pure quantum state, such as through the use of a Stern–Gerlach apparatus, the spin vector does have a well-defined experimental meaning: It specifies the direction in ordinary space in which a subsequent detector must be oriented in order to achieve the maximum possible probability (100%) of detecting every particle in the collection. For spin-1/2 particles, this probability drops off smoothly as the angle between the spin vector and the detector increases, until at an angle of 180°—that is, for detectors oriented in the opposite direction to the spin vector—the expectation of detecting particles from the collection reaches a minimum of 0%.

As a qualitative concept, the spin vector is often handy because it is easy to picture classically. For instance, quantum-mechanical spin can exhibit phenomena analogous to classical gyroscopic effects. For example, one can exert a kind of "torque" on an electron by putting it in a magnetic field (the field acts upon the electron's intrinsic magnetic dipole moment—see the following section). The result is that the spin vector undergoes precession, just like a classical gyroscope. This phenomenon is known as electron spin resonance (ESR). The equivalent behaviour of protons in atomic nuclei is used in nuclear magnetic resonance (NMR) spectroscopy and imaging.

Mathematically, quantum-mechanical spin states are described by vector-like objects known as spinors. There are subtle differences between the behavior of spinors and vectors under coordinate rotations. For example, rotating a spin-1/2 particle by 360° does not bring it back to the same quantum state, but to the state with the opposite quantum phase; this is detectable, in principle, with interference experiments. To return the particle to its exact original state, one needs a 720° rotation. (The plate trick and Möbius strip give non-quantum analogies.) A spin-zero particle can only have a single quantum state, even after torque is applied. Rotating a spin-2 particle 180° can bring it back to the same quantum state, and a spin-4 particle should be rotated 90° to bring it back to the same quantum state. The spin-2 particle can be analogous to a straight stick that looks the same even after it is rotated 180°, and a spin-0 particle can be imagined as sphere, which looks the same after whatever angle it is turned through.

== Mathematical formulation ==
=== Definitions ===
==== Intrinsic angular momentum ====
A particle is said to possess intrinsic spin $s$ if the quantum-mechanical states of that particle in its own rest frame are eigenstates of the operator $\mathbf{J}^2$ with eigenvalue $\hbar^2 s(s+1)$.

==== Relativistic quantum theory ====
In relativistic quantum theory, spin is defined as an invariant label of a time-like unitary irreducible representation of the Poincaré group. For time-like representations, corresponding to massive particles, the unitary irreducible representations are characterized by the mass $M$ and the spin $s$, where $s$ labels an irreducible projective representation of the rotation group $SO(3)$.

=== Operator ===
Spin obeys commutation relations analogous to those of the orbital angular momentum:
$$\left[\hat S_j, \hat S_k\right] = i \hbar \varepsilon_{jkl} \hat S_l,$$
where ε_{jkl} is the Levi-Civita symbol. It follows (as with angular momentum) that the eigenvectors of $\hat S^2$ and $\hat S_z$ (expressed as kets in the total S basis) are
$$\begin{align}
\hat S^2 |s, m_s\rangle &= \hbar^2 s(s + 1) |s, m_s\rangle, \\
\hat S_z |s, m_s\rangle &= \hbar m_s |s, m_s\rangle.
\end{align}$$

The spin raising and lowering operators acting on these eigenvectors give
$$\hat S_\pm |s, m_s\rangle = \hbar \sqrt{s(s + 1) - m_s(m_s \pm 1)} |s, m_s \pm 1\rangle,$$
where $\hat S_\pm = \hat S_x \pm i \hat S_y$.

But unlike orbital angular momentum, the eigenvectors are not spherical harmonics. They are not functions of θ and φ. There is also no reason to exclude half-integer values of s and m_{s}.

All quantum-mechanical particles possess an intrinsic spin $s$ (though this value may be equal to zero). The projection of the spin $s$ on any axis is quantized in units of the reduced Planck constant, such that the state function of the particle is, say, not $\psi = \psi(\mathbf r)$, but $\psi = \psi(\mathbf r,s_z)$, where $s_z$ can take only the values of the following discrete set:
$$s_z \in \{-s\hbar, -(s - 1)\hbar, \dots, +(s - 1)\hbar, +s\hbar\}.$$

One distinguishes bosons (integer spin) and fermions (half-integer spin). The total angular momentum conserved in interaction processes is then the sum of the orbital angular momentum and the spin.

=== Pauli matrices ===
The quantum-mechanical operators associated with spin-1/2 observables are
$$\hat{\mathbf{S}} = \frac{\hbar}{2} \boldsymbol{\sigma},$$
where in Cartesian components
$$S_x = \frac{\hbar}{2} \sigma_x, \quad S_y = \frac{\hbar}{2} \sigma_y, \quad S_z = \frac{\hbar}{2} \sigma_z.$$

For the special case of spin-1/2 particles, σ_{x}, σ_{y} and σ_{z} are the three Pauli matrices:
$$\sigma_x = \begin{pmatrix}
0 & 1\\
1 & 0
\end{pmatrix},
\quad
\sigma_y = \begin{pmatrix}
0 & -i\\
i & 0
\end{pmatrix},
\quad
\sigma_z = \begin{pmatrix}
1 & 0\\
0 & -1
\end{pmatrix}.$$

=== Pauli exclusion principle ===
The Pauli exclusion principle states that the wavefunction $\psi(\mathbf r_1, \sigma_1, \dots, \mathbf r_N, \sigma_N)$ for a system of N identical particles having spin s must change upon interchanges of any two of the N particles as
$$\psi(\dots, \mathbf r_i, \sigma_i, \dots, \mathbf r_j, \sigma_j, \dots ) =
(-1)^{2s} \psi(\dots, \mathbf r_j, \sigma_j, \dots, \mathbf r_i, \sigma_i, \dots).$$

Thus, for bosons the prefactor (−1)^{2s} will reduce to +1, for fermions to −1. This permutation postulate for N-particle state functions has most important consequences in daily life, e.g. the periodic table of the chemical elements.

=== Rotations ===
As described above, quantum mechanics states that components of angular momentum measured along any direction can only take a number of discrete values. The most convenient quantum-mechanical description of particle's spin is therefore with a set of complex numbers corresponding to amplitudes of finding a given value of projection of its intrinsic angular momentum on a given axis. For instance, for a spin-1/2 particle, we would need two numbers a_{±1/2}, giving amplitudes of finding it with projection of angular momentum equal to +ħ/2 and −ħ/2, satisfying the requirement
$$|a_{+1/2}|^2 + |a_{-1/2}|^2 = 1.$$

For a generic particle with spin s, we would need 2s + 1 such parameters. Since these numbers depend on the choice of the axis, they transform into each other non-trivially when this axis is rotated. It is clear that the transformation law must be linear, so we can represent it by associating a matrix with each rotation, and the product of two transformation matrices corresponding to rotations A and B must be equal (up to phase) to the matrix representing rotation AB. Further, rotations preserve the quantum-mechanical inner product, and so should our transformation matrices:
$$\sum_{m=-j}^j a_m^* b_m = \sum_{m=-j}^j \left(\sum_{n=-j}^j U_{nm} a_n\right)^* \left(\sum_{k=-j}^j U_{km} b_k\right),$$
$$\sum_{n=-j}^j \sum_{k=-j}^j U_{np}^* U_{kq} = \delta_{pq}.$$

Mathematically speaking, these matrices furnish a unitary projective representation of the rotation group SO(3). Each such representation corresponds to a representation of the covering group of SO(3), which is SU(2). There is one n-dimensional irreducible representation of SU(2) for each dimension, though this representation is n-dimensional real for odd n and n-dimensional complex for even n (hence of real dimension 2n). For a rotation by angle θ in the plane with normal vector $\hat{\boldsymbol{\theta}}$,
$$U = e^{-\frac{i}{\hbar} \boldsymbol{\theta} \cdot \mathbf{S}},$$
where $\boldsymbol{\theta} = \theta \hat{\boldsymbol{\theta}}$, and S is the vector of spin operators.

Proof

Working in the coordinate system where $\hat{\theta} = \hat{z}$, we would like to show that S_{x} and S_{y} are rotated into each other by the angle θ. Starting with S_{x}. Using units where ħ = 1:
$$\begin{align}
S_x \rightarrow U^\dagger S_x U &= e^{i \theta S_z} S_x e^{-i \theta S_z} \\
&= S_x + (i \theta) \left[S_z, S_x\right] + \left(\frac{1}{2!}\right) (i \theta)^2 \left[S_z, \left[S_z, S_x\right]\right] + \left(\frac{1}{3!}\right) (i \theta)^3 \left[S_z, \left[S_z, \left[S_z, S_x\right]\right]\right] + \cdots
\end{align}$$

Using the spin operator commutation relations, we see that the commutators evaluate to i S_{y} for the odd terms in the series, and to S_{x} for all of the even terms. Thus:
$$\begin{align}
U^\dagger S_x U
&= S_x \left[ 1 - \frac{\theta^2}{2!} + \cdots \right] - S_y \left[ \theta - \frac{\theta^3}{3!} \cdots \right] \\
&= S_x \cos\theta - S_y \sin\theta,
\end{align}$$
as expected. Note that since we only relied on the spin operator commutation relations, this proof holds for any dimension (i.e., for any principal spin quantum number s)

A generic rotation in 3-dimensional space can be built by compounding operators of this type using Euler angles:
$$\mathcal{R}(\alpha, \beta, \gamma) = e^{-i\alpha S_x} e^{-i\beta S_y} e^{-i\gamma S_z}.$$

An irreducible representation of this group of operators is furnished by the Wigner D-matrix:
$$D^s_{m'm}(\alpha, \beta, \gamma) \equiv
\langle sm' | \mathcal{R}(\alpha, \beta, \gamma) | sm \rangle =
e^{-im'\alpha} d^s_{m'm}(\beta)e^{-i m\gamma},$$
where
$$d^s_{m'm}(\beta) = \langle sm' | e^{-i\beta s_y} | sm \rangle$$
is Wigner's small d-matrix. Note that for γ = 2π and α = β = 0; i.e., a full rotation about the z axis, the Wigner D-matrix elements become
$$D^s_{m'm}(0, 0, 2\pi) = d^s_{m'm}(0) e^{-i m 2 \pi} = \delta_{m'm} (-1)^{2m}.$$

Recalling that a generic spin state can be written as a superposition of states with definite m, we see that if s is an integer, the values of m are all integers, and this matrix corresponds to the identity operator. However, if s is a half-integer, the values of m are also all half-integers, giving (−1)^{2m} = −1 for all m, and hence upon rotation by 2π the state picks up a minus sign. This fact is a crucial element of the proof of the spin–statistics theorem.

=== Lorentz transformations ===
We could try the same approach to determine the behavior of spin under general Lorentz transformations, but we would immediately discover a major obstacle. Unlike SO(3), the group of Lorentz transformations SO(3,1) is non-compact and therefore does not have any faithful, unitary, finite-dimensional representations.

In case of spin-1/2 particles, it is possible to find a construction that includes both a finite-dimensional representation and a scalar product that is preserved by this representation. We associate a 4-component Dirac spinor ψ with each particle. These spinors transform under Lorentz transformations according to the law
$$\psi' = \exp{\left(\tfrac{1}{8} \omega_{\mu\nu} [\gamma_{\mu}, \gamma_{\nu}]\right)} \psi,$$
where γ_{ν} are gamma matrices, and ω_{μν} is an antisymmetric 4 × 4 matrix parametrizing the transformation. It can be shown that the scalar product
$$\langle\psi|\phi\rangle = \bar{\psi}\phi = \psi^\dagger \gamma_0 \phi$$
is preserved. It is not, however, positive-definite, so the representation is not unitary.

=== Measurement of spin along the x, y, or z axes ===
Each of the (Hermitian) Pauli matrices of spin-1/2 particles has two eigenvalues, +1 and −1. The corresponding normalized eigenvectors are
$$\begin{array}{lclc}
\psi_{x+} = \left|\frac{1}{2}, \frac{+1}{2}\right\rangle_x =
\displaystyle\frac{1}{\sqrt{2}} \!\!\!\!\! & \begin{pmatrix}{1}\\{1}\end{pmatrix},  &
\psi_{x-} = \left|\frac{1}{2}, \frac{-1}{2}\right\rangle_x =
\displaystyle\frac{1}{\sqrt{2}} \!\!\!\!\! & \begin{pmatrix}{1}\\{-1}\end{pmatrix}, \\
\psi_{y+} = \left|\frac{1}{2}, \frac{+1}{2}\right\rangle_y =
\displaystyle\frac{1}{\sqrt{2}} \!\!\!\!\! & \begin{pmatrix}{1}\\{i}\end{pmatrix},  &
\psi_{y-} = \left|\frac{1}{2}, \frac{-1}{2}\right\rangle_y =
\displaystyle\frac{1}{\sqrt{2}} \!\!\!\!\! & \begin{pmatrix}{1}\\{-i}\end{pmatrix}, \\
\psi_{z+} = \left|\frac{1}{2}, \frac{+1}{2}\right\rangle_z =                          &
\begin{pmatrix} 1 \\ 0 \end{pmatrix}, &
\psi_{z-} = \left|\frac{1}{2}, \frac{-1}{2}\right\rangle_z =                          &
\begin{pmatrix} 0 \\ 1 \end{pmatrix}.
\end{array}$$

(Because any eigenvector multiplied by a constant is still an eigenvector, there is ambiguity about the overall sign. In this article, the convention is chosen to make the first element imaginary and negative if there is a sign ambiguity. The present convention is used by software such as SymPy; while many physics textbooks, such as Sakurai and Griffiths, prefer to make it real and positive.)

By the postulates of quantum mechanics, an experiment designed to measure the electron spin on the x, y, or z axis can only yield an eigenvalue of the corresponding spin operator (S_{x}, S_{y} or S_{z}) on that axis, i.e. ħ/2 or −ħ/2. The quantum state of a particle (with respect to spin), can be represented by a two-component spinor:
$$\psi = \begin{pmatrix} a + bi \\ c + di \end{pmatrix}.$$

When the spin of this particle is measured with respect to a given axis (in this example, the x axis), the probability that its spin will be measured as ħ/2 is just $\big|\langle \psi_{x+}|\psi\rangle\big|^2$. Correspondingly, the probability that its spin will be measured as −ħ/2 is just $\big|\langle\psi_{x-}|\psi\rangle\big|^2$. Following the measurement, the spin state of the particle collapses into the corresponding eigenstate. As a result, if the particle's spin along a given axis has been measured to have a given eigenvalue, all measurements will yield the same eigenvalue (since $\big|\langle\psi_{x+} | \psi_{x+}\rangle\big|^2 = 1$, etc.), provided that no measurements of the spin are made along other axes.

=== Measurement of spin along an arbitrary axis ===
The operator to measure spin along an arbitrary axis direction is easily obtained from the Pauli spin matrices. Let u = (u_{x}, u_{y}, u_{z}) be an arbitrary unit vector. Then the operator for spin in this direction is simply
$$S_u = \frac{\hbar}{2} (u_x \sigma_x + u_y \sigma_y + u_z \sigma_z).$$

The operator S_{u} has eigenvalues of ±ħ/2, just like the usual spin matrices. This method of finding the operator for spin in an arbitrary direction generalizes to higher spin states, one takes the dot product of the direction with a vector of the three operators for the three x-, y-, z-axis directions.

A normalized spinor for spin-1/2 in the (u_{x}, u_{y}, u_{z}) direction (which works for all spin states except spin down, where it will give 0/0) is
$$\frac{1}{\sqrt{2 + 2u_z}} \begin{pmatrix} 1 + u_z \\ u_x + iu_y \end{pmatrix}.$$

The above spinor is obtained in the usual way by diagonalizing the σ_{u} matrix and finding the eigenstates corresponding to the eigenvalues. In quantum mechanics, vectors are termed "normalized" when multiplied by a normalizing factor, which results in the vector having a length of unity.

=== Compatibility of spin measurements ===
Since the Pauli matrices do not commute, measurements of spin along different axes are incompatible. That is, a measurement along one axis may change the result of a subsequent measurement along a different axis. For example, if we measure along the x axis, our state will become $|\psi_{x\pm} \rangle$, each of which is an even mixture of $|\psi_{z+} \rangle$ and $|\psi_{z-} \rangle$. This means that after the measurement along the x axis, a measurement along the z-axis has an even chance of being $|\psi_{z+} \rangle$ or $|\psi_{z-} \rangle$, regardless of the prior state.

=== Higher spins ===
The spin-1/2 operator S = ħ/2σ forms the fundamental representation of SU(2). By taking Kronecker products of this representation with itself repeatedly, one may construct all higher irreducible representations. That is, the resulting spin operators for higher-spin systems in three spatial dimensions can be calculated for arbitrarily large s using this spin operator and ladder operators. For example, taking the Kronecker product of two spin-1/2 yields a four-dimensional representation, which is separable into a 3-dimensional spin-1 (triplet states) and a 1-dimensional spin-0 representation (singlet state).

The resulting irreducible representations yield the following spin matrices and eigenvalues in the z-basis:

1. For spin 1 they are
  $$\begin{align}
S_x &= \frac{\hbar}{\sqrt{2}}
\begin{pmatrix}
0 & 1 & 0 \\
1 & 0 & 1 \\
0 & 1 & 0
\end{pmatrix}, &
\left|1, +1\right\rangle_x &= \frac{1}{2} \begin{pmatrix} 1 \\{\sqrt{2}}\\ 1 \end{pmatrix},  &
\left|1,  0\right\rangle_x &= \frac{1}{\sqrt{2}} \begin{pmatrix} -1 \\ 0 \\ 1 \end{pmatrix}, &
\left|1, -1\right\rangle_x &= \frac{1}{2} \begin{pmatrix} 1 \\{-\sqrt{2}}\\ 1 \end{pmatrix}  \\
S_y &= \frac{\hbar}{\sqrt{2}}
\begin{pmatrix}
0 & -i  &  0 \\
i &  0  & -i \\
0 &  i  &  0
\end{pmatrix}, &
\left|1, +1\right\rangle_y &= \frac{1}{2} \begin{pmatrix} -1 \\ -i\sqrt{2} \\ 1 \end{pmatrix}, &
\left|1,  0\right\rangle_y &= \frac{1}{\sqrt{2}} \begin{pmatrix} 1 \\ 0 \\ 1 \end{pmatrix},    &
\left|1, -1\right\rangle_y &= \frac{1}{2} \begin{pmatrix} -1 \\  i\sqrt{2} \\ 1 \end{pmatrix}  \\
S_z &= \hbar
\begin{pmatrix}
1 & 0 &  0 \\
0 & 0 &  0 \\
0 & 0 & -1
\end{pmatrix}, &
\left|1, +1\right\rangle_z &= \begin{pmatrix} 1 \\ 0 \\ 0 \end{pmatrix}, &
\left|1,  0\right\rangle_z &= \begin{pmatrix} 0 \\ 1 \\ 0 \end{pmatrix}, &
\left|1, -1\right\rangle_z &= \begin{pmatrix} 0 \\ 0 \\ 1 \end{pmatrix}  \\
\end{align}$$
2. For spin 3/2 they are
  $$\begin{array}{lclc}
S_x = \frac\hbar2
\begin{pmatrix}
0        &\sqrt{3} &0        &0\\
\sqrt{3} &0        &2        &0\\
0        &2        &0        &\sqrt{3}\\
0        &0        &\sqrt{3} &0
\end{pmatrix}, \!\!\! &
\left|\frac{3}{2}, \frac{+3}{2}\right\rangle_x =\!\!\! & \frac{1}{2\sqrt{2}} \begin{pmatrix} 1 \\{\sqrt{3}}\\{\sqrt{3}}\\ 1 \end{pmatrix}, \!\!\! &
\left|\frac{3}{2}, \frac{+1}{2}\right\rangle_x =\!\!\! & \frac{1}{2\sqrt{2}} \begin{pmatrix}{-\sqrt{3}}\\ -1 \\ 1 \\{\sqrt{3}}\end{pmatrix}, \!\!\! &
\left|\frac{3}{2}, \frac{-1}{2}\right\rangle_x =\!\!\! & \frac{1}{2\sqrt{2}} \begin{pmatrix}{\sqrt{3}}\\ -1 \\ -1 \\{\sqrt{3}}\end{pmatrix}, \!\!\! &
\left|\frac{3}{2}, \frac{-3}{2}\right\rangle_x =\!\!\! & \frac{1}{2\sqrt{2}} \begin{pmatrix} -1 \\{\sqrt{3}}\\{-\sqrt{3}}\\ 1 \end{pmatrix} \\
S_y = \frac\hbar2
\begin{pmatrix}
0         &-i\sqrt{3} &0         &0\\
i\sqrt{3} &0          &-2i       &0\\
0         &2i         &0         &-i\sqrt{3}\\
0         &0          &i\sqrt{3} &0
\end{pmatrix}, \!\!\! &
\left|\frac{3}{2}, \frac{+3}{2}\right\rangle_y =\!\!\! & \frac{1}{2\sqrt{2}} \begin{pmatrix}{i}\\{-\sqrt{3}}\\{-i\sqrt{3}}\\ 1 \end{pmatrix}, \!\!\! &
\left|\frac{3}{2}, \frac{+1}{2}\right\rangle_y =\!\!\! & \frac{1}{2\sqrt{2}} \begin{pmatrix}{-i\sqrt{3}}\\ 1 \\{-i}\\{\sqrt{3}}\end{pmatrix}, \!\!\! &
\left|\frac{3}{2}, \frac{-1}{2}\right\rangle_y =\!\!\! & \frac{1}{2\sqrt{2}} \begin{pmatrix}{i\sqrt{3}}\\ 1 \\{i}\\{\sqrt{3}}\end{pmatrix}, \!\!\! &
\left|\frac{3}{2}, \frac{-3}{2}\right\rangle_y =\!\!\! & \frac{1}{2\sqrt{2}} \begin{pmatrix}{-i}\\{-\sqrt{3}}\\{i\sqrt{3}}\\ 1 \end{pmatrix} \\
S_z = \frac\hbar2
\begin{pmatrix}
3 &0 &0  &0\\
0 &1 &0  &0\\
0 &0 &-1 &0\\
0 &0 &0  &-3
\end{pmatrix}, \!\!\! &
\left|\frac{3}{2}, \frac{+3}{2}\right\rangle_z =\!\!\! & \begin{pmatrix} 1 \\ 0 \\ 0 \\ 0 \end{pmatrix}, \!\!\! &
\left|\frac{3}{2}, \frac{+1}{2}\right\rangle_z =\!\!\! & \begin{pmatrix} 0 \\ 1 \\ 0 \\ 0 \end{pmatrix}, \!\!\! &
\left|\frac{3}{2}, \frac{-1}{2}\right\rangle_z =\!\!\! & \begin{pmatrix} 0 \\ 0 \\ 1 \\ 0 \end{pmatrix}, \!\!\! &
\left|\frac{3}{2}, \frac{-3}{2}\right\rangle_z =\!\!\! & \begin{pmatrix} 0 \\ 0 \\ 0 \\ 1 \end{pmatrix} \\
\end{array}$$
3. For spin 5/2 they are
  $$\begin{align}
\boldsymbol{S}_x &= \frac{\hbar}{2}
\begin{pmatrix}
0 &\sqrt{5} &0 &0 &0 &0 \\
\sqrt{5} &0 &2\sqrt{2} &0 &0 &0 \\
0 &2\sqrt{2} &0 &3 &0 &0 \\
0 &0 &3 &0 &2\sqrt{2} &0 \\
0 &0 &0 &2\sqrt{2} &0 &\sqrt{5} \\
0 &0 &0 &0 &\sqrt{5} &0
\end{pmatrix}, \\
\boldsymbol{S}_y &= \frac{\hbar}{2}
\begin{pmatrix}
0 &-i\sqrt{5} &0 &0 &0 &0 \\
i\sqrt{5} &0 &-2i\sqrt{2} &0 &0 &0 \\
0 &2i\sqrt{2} &0 &-3i &0 &0 \\
0 &0 &3i &0 &-2i\sqrt{2} &0 \\
0 &0 &0 &2i\sqrt{2} &0 &-i\sqrt{5} \\
0 &0 &0 &0 &i\sqrt{5} &0
\end{pmatrix}, \\
\boldsymbol{S}_z &= \frac{\hbar}{2}
\begin{pmatrix}
5 &0 &0 &0 &0 &0 \\
0 &3 &0 &0 &0 &0 \\
0 &0 &1 &0 &0 &0 \\
0 &0 &0 &-1 &0 &0 \\
0 &0 &0 &0 &-3 &0 \\
0 &0 &0 &0 &0 &-5
\end{pmatrix}.
\end{align}$$
4. The generalization of these matrices for arbitrary spin s is
  $$\begin{align}
\left(S_x\right)_{ab} & = \frac{\hbar}{2}  \left(\delta_{a,b+1} + \delta_{a+1,b}\right) \sqrt{(s + 1)(a + b - 1) - ab}, \\
\left(S_y\right)_{ab} & = \frac{i\hbar}{2} \left(\delta_{a,b+1} - \delta_{a+1,b}\right) \sqrt{(s + 1)(a + b - 1) - ab}, \\
\left(S_z\right)_{ab} & = \hbar (s + 1 - a) \delta_{a,b} = \hbar (s + 1 - b) \delta_{a,b},
\end{align}$$
  where indices $a, b$ are integer numbers such that
  $$1 \le a \le 2s + 1, \quad 1 \le b \le 2s + 1.$$

Also useful in the quantum mechanics of multiparticle systems, the general Pauli group G_{n} is defined to consist of all n-fold tensor products of Pauli matrices.

The analog formula of Euler's formula in terms of the Pauli matrices
$$\hat{R}(\theta, \hat{\mathbf{n}}) = e^{i \frac{\theta}{2} \hat{\mathbf{n}} \cdot \boldsymbol{\sigma}} =
I \cos \frac{\theta}{2} + i \left(\hat{\mathbf{n}} \cdot \boldsymbol{\sigma}\right) \sin \frac{\theta}{2}$$
for higher spins is tractable, but less simple.

== Parity ==
In tables of the spin quantum number s for nuclei or particles, the spin is often followed by a "+" or "−". This refers to the parity with "+" for even parity (wave function unchanged by spatial inversion) and "−" for odd parity (wave function negated by spatial inversion). For example, see the isotopes of bismuth, in which the list of isotopes includes the column nuclear spin and parity. For Bi-209, the longest-lived isotope, the entry 9/2− means that the nuclear spin is 9/2 and the parity is odd.

== Measuring spin ==
The nuclear spin of atoms can be determined by sophisticated improvements to the original Stern–Gerlach experiment. A single-energy (monochromatic) molecular beam of atoms in an inhomogeneous magnetic field will split into beams representing each possible spin quantum state. For an atom with electronic spin S and nuclear spin I, there are (2S + 1)(2I + 1) spin states. For example, neutral Na atoms, which have S = 1/2, were passed through a series of inhomogeneous magnetic fields that selected one of the two electronic spin states and separated the nuclear spin states, from which four beams were observed. Thus, the nuclear spin for ^{23}Na atoms was found to be I = 3/2.

The spin of pions, a type of elementary particle, was determined by the principle of detailed balance applied to those collisions of protons that produced charged pions and deuterium.
$$p + p \rightarrow \pi^+ +d$$
The known spin values for protons and deuterium allows analysis of the collision cross-section to show that $\pi^+$ has spin $s_\pi = 0$. A different approach is needed for neutral pions. In that case the decay produced two gamma ray photons with spin one:
$$\pi^0 \rightarrow 2\gamma$$
This result supplemented with additional analysis leads to the conclusion that the neutral pion also has spin zero.

== Applications ==
Spin has important theoretical implications and practical applications. Well-established direct applications of spin include:

- Nuclear magnetic resonance (NMR) spectroscopy in chemistry;
- Electron spin resonance (ESR or EPR) spectroscopy in chemistry and physics;
- Magnetic resonance imaging (MRI) in medicine, a type of applied NMR, which relies on proton spin density;
- Giant magnetoresistive (GMR) drive-head technology in modern hard disks.

Electron spin plays an important role in magnetism, with applications for instance in computer memories. The manipulation of nuclear spin by radio-frequency waves (nuclear magnetic resonance) is important in chemical spectroscopy and medical imaging.

Spin–orbit coupling leads to the fine structure of atomic spectra, which is used in atomic clocks and in the modern definition of the second. Precise measurements of the g-factor of the electron have played an important role in the development and verification of quantum electrodynamics. Photon spin is associated with the polarization of light (photon polarization).

An emerging application of spin is as a binary information carrier in spin transistors. The original concept, proposed in 1990, is known as Datta–Das spin transistor. Electronics based on spin transistors are referred to as spintronics. The manipulation of spin in dilute magnetic semiconductor materials, such as metal-doped ZnO or TiO_{2} imparts a further degree of freedom and has the potential to facilitate the fabrication of more efficient electronics.

There are many indirect applications and manifestations of spin and the associated Pauli exclusion principle, starting with the periodic table of chemistry.

== History ==
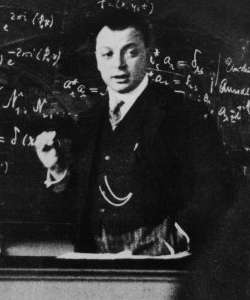
Wolfgang Pauli lecturing

Spin was first discovered in the context of the emission spectrum of alkali metals. Starting around 1910, many experiments on different atoms produced a collection of relationships involving quantum numbers for atomic energy levels partially summarized in Bohr's model for the atom Transitions between levels obeyed selection rules and the rules were known to be correlated with even or odd atomic number. Additional information was known from changes to atomic spectra observed in strong magnetic fields, known as the Zeeman effect. In 1924, Wolfgang Pauli used this large collection of empirical observations to propose a new degree of freedom, introducing what he called a "two-valuedness not describable classically" associated with the electron in the outermost shell.

The physical interpretation of Pauli's "degree of freedom" was initially unknown. Ralph Kronig, one of Alfred Landé's assistants, suggested in early 1925 that it was produced by the self-rotation of the electron. When Pauli heard about the idea, he criticized it severely, noting that the electron's hypothetical surface would have to be moving faster than the speed of light in order for it to rotate quickly enough to produce the necessary angular momentum. This would violate the theory of relativity. Largely due to Pauli's criticism, Kronig decided not to publish his idea.

In the autumn of 1925, the same thought came to Dutch physicists George Uhlenbeck and Samuel Goudsmit at Leiden University. Under the advice of Paul Ehrenfest, they published their results. The young physicists immediately regretted the publication: Hendrik Lorentz and Werner Heisenberg both pointed out problems with the concept of a spinning electron.

Pauli was especially unconvinced and continued to pursue his two-valued degree of freedom. This allowed him to formulate the Pauli exclusion principle, stating that no two electrons can have the same quantum state in the same quantum system.

Fortunately, by February 1926, Llewellyn Thomas managed to resolve a factor-of-two discrepancy between experimental results for the fine structure in the hydrogen spectrum and calculations based on Uhlenbeck and Goudsmit's (and Kronig's unpublished) model. This discrepancy was due to a relativistic effect, the difference between the electron's rotating rest frame and the nuclear rest frame; the effect is now known as Thomas precession. Thomas' result convinced Pauli that electron spin was the correct interpretation of his two-valued degree of freedom, while he continued to insist that the classical rotating charge model is invalid.

In 1927, Pauli formalized the theory of spin using the theory of quantum mechanics invented by Erwin Schrödinger and Werner Heisenberg. He pioneered the use of Pauli matrices as a representation of the spin operators and introduced a two-component spinor wave-function.

Pauli's theory of spin was non-relativistic. In 1928, Paul Dirac published his relativistic electron equation, using a four-component spinor (known as a "Dirac spinor") for the electron wave-function. In 1940, Pauli proved the spin–statistics theorem, which states that fermions have half-integer spin, and bosons have integer spin.

In retrospect, the first direct experimental evidence of the electron spin was the Stern–Gerlach experiment of 1922. However, the correct explanation of this experiment was only given in 1927. The original interpretation assumed the two spots observed in the experiment were due to quantized orbital angular momentum. However, in 1927 Ronald G. J. Fraser showed that sodium atoms are isotropic with no orbital angular momentum and suggested that the observed magnetic properties were due to electron spin. In the same year, Thomas Erwin Phipps and John Bellamy Taylor applied the Stern–Gerlach technique to hydrogen atoms; the ground state of hydrogen has zero angular momentum but the measurements again showed two peaks. Once the quantum theory became established, it became clear that the original interpretation could not have been correct: the possible values of orbital angular momentum along one axis is always an odd number, unlike the observations. Hydrogen atoms have a single electron with two spin states giving the two spots observed; silver atoms have closed shells which do not contribute to the magnetic moment and only the unmatched outer electron's spin responds to the field.

== See also ==
- Chirality (physics)
- Dynamic nuclear polarization
- Helicity (particle physics)
- Holstein–Primakoff transformation
- Kramers' theorem
- Pauli equation
- Pauli–Lubanski pseudovector
- Rarita–Schwinger equation
- Representation theory of SU(2)
- Spin angular momentum of light
- Spin engineering
- Spin-flip
- Spin isomers of hydrogen
- Spin–orbit interaction
- Spin tensor
- Spintronics
- Spin wave
- Yrast
