= Surface magnon polariton =

Surface magnon-polaritons (SMPs) are a type of quasiparticle in condensed matter physics. They arise from the coupling of incident electromagnetic (EM) radiations to the magnetic dipole polarization in the surface layers of a solid. Magnons are analogous to other forms of polaritons, such as plasmons and phonons, but represent an oscillation of the magnetic component of the solid's EM field rather than its electric component or a mechanical oscillation in the solid's atomic structure.

They are sometimes referred to as magnetic surface polaritons (MSPs).

By employing artificially constructed metamaterials whose properties mainly stem from their engineered internal fine structures rather than their bulk physical make up, it is possible to more easily achieve useful SMPs. However, they can be found in several natural magnetic materials, including at THz frequencies in antiferromagnetic crystals.

Magnons offer a way to control light–matter interactions at Terahertz frequencies.
