= Magnon =

Spin 1 quasiparticle; quantum of a spin wave

A magnon is a quasiparticle, a collective excitation of the spin structure of an electron in a crystal lattice. In the equivalent wave picture of quantum mechanics, a magnon can be viewed as a quantized spin wave. Magnons carry a fixed amount of energy and lattice momentum, and are spin-1, indicating they obey boson behavior.

== History ==
Felix Bloch introduced the concept of a magnon in 1930 to explain the reduction of the spontaneous magnetization in a ferromagnet. At absolute zero temperature (0 K), a Heisenberg ferromagnet reaches the state of lowest energy (so-called ground state), in which all of the atomic spins (and hence magnetic moments) point in the same direction. As the temperature increases, more and more spins deviate randomly from the alignment, increasing the internal energy and reducing the net magnetization. Viewing the perfectly magnetized state at zero temperature as the vacuum state of the ferromagnet, shows the low-temperature state with a few misaligned spins as a gas of quasiparticles, in this case magnons. Each magnon reduces the total spin along the direction of magnetization by one unit of $\hbar$ (the reduced Planck constant) and the magnetization by $\gamma\hbar$, where $\gamma$ is the gyromagnetic ratio. This leads to Bloch's law for the temperature dependence of spontaneous magnetization:

$$M(T) = M_0 \left[1 - \left(\frac{T}{T_\text{c}}\right)^{3/2}\right]$$

where $T_\text{c}$ is the (material dependent) critical temperature, and $M_0$ is the magnitude of the spontaneous magnetization.

Theodore Holstein and Henry Primakoff, and then Freeman Dyson further developed the quantitative theory of magnons, quantized spin waves. Using the second quantization formalism they showed that magnons behave as weakly interacting quasiparticles obeying Bose–Einstein statistics for bosons.

Bertram Brockhouse achieved direct experimental detection of magnons by inelastic neutron scattering in ferrite in 1957. Magnons were later detected in ferromagnets, ferrimagnets, and antiferromagnets.

The fact that magnons obey Bose–Einstein statistics was confirmed by light-scattering experiments done during the 1960s through the 1980s. Classical theory predicts equal intensity of Stokes and anti-Stokes lines. However, the scattering showed that if the magnon energy is comparable to or smaller than the thermal energy, or $\hbar \omega < k_\text{B} T$, then the Stokes line becomes more intense, as follows from Bose–Einstein statistics. Bose–Einstein condensation of magnons was proven in an antiferromagnet at low temperatures by Nikuni et al. and in a ferrimagnet by Demokritov et al. at room temperature. In 2015 Uchida et al. reported the generation of spin currents by surface plasmon resonance.

== Paramagnons ==
Paramagnons are magnons in magnetic materials which are in their high temperature, disordered (paramagnetic) phase. For low enough temperatures, the local atomic magnetic moments (spins) in ferromagnetic or anti-ferromagnetic compounds become ordered. Small oscillations of the moments around their natural direction propagate as waves (magnons). At temperatures higher than the critical temperature, long range order is lost, but spins align locally (in patches), allowing for spin waves to propagate for short distances. These waves are known as a paramagnon, and undergo diffusive (instead of ballistic or long range) transport.

The concept was proposed based on the spin fluctuations in transition metals, by Berk and Schrieffer and Doniach and Engelsberg, to explain additional repulsion between electrons in some metals, which reduces the critical temperature for superconductivity.

== Properties ==
Magnon behavior can be studied with a variety of scattering techniques. Magnons behave as a Bose gas with no chemical potential. Microwave pumping can be used to excite spin waves and create additional non-equilibrium magnons which thermalize into phonons. At a critical density, a condensate is formed, which appears as the emission of monochromatic microwaves. This microwave source can be tuned with an applied magnetic field.

== See also ==
- Magnonics
- Holstein–Primakoff transformation
- Surface magnon polariton
