= List of Guggenheim Fellowships awarded in 1984 =

Two hundred and eighty-three scholars, artists, and scientists received Guggenheim Fellowships in 1984. $5,520,000 was disbursed between the recipients, who were chosen from an applicant pool of 3,542 and represented 100 different institutions. University of California, Berkeley had the most fellowship recipients awarded to its faculty (13), followed by Harvard University (9) in second and University of Pennsylvania and Cornell University in third (8 each).

== 1983 U.S. and Canadian Fellows ==
Category	Field of Study	Fellow	Institutional association	Research topic	Notes	Ref
Creative Arts	Choreography	Trisha Brown	Trisha Brown Company	Choreography	Also won in 1975	
Creative Arts	Choreography	Eiko Otake Yamada		Choreography	With Takashi Koma Yamada	
Creative Arts	Choreography	Takashi Koma Yamada		Choreography	With Eiko Otake Yamada	
Creative Arts	Drama & Performance Art	Ping Chong		Theatre piece		
Creative Arts	Drama & Performance Art	David Henry Hwang		Playwriting		
Creative Arts	Drama & Performance Art	Bill Irwin		Developing dance theatre pieces		
Creative Arts	Drama & Performance Art	Larry Ketron		Playwriting		
Creative Arts	Drama & Performance Art	James Lapine		Playwriting		
Creative Arts	Fiction	Bill Barich		Writing		
Creative Arts	Fiction	Richard C. Bausch	George Mason University	Writing		
Creative Arts	Fiction	Stephen Dixon	Johns Hopkins University	Writing		
Creative Arts	Fiction	Frederick Exley		Writing		
Creative Arts	Fiction	Gordon Lish	Columbia University	Writing		
Creative Arts	Fiction	Ron Loewinsohn	UC Berkeley	Writing		
Creative Arts	Fiction	Susan Fromberg Schaeffer	Brooklyn College	Writing		
Creative Arts	Fiction	Lynne Sharon Schwartz	Columbia University	Writing		
Creative Arts	Fiction	Joan Silber	New York University	Writing		
Creative Arts	Fiction	Jean L. Thompson	University of Illinois	Writing		
Creative Arts	Fiction	Joan Williams		Book about life in Fairfield County, Connecticut		
Creative Arts	Film	Constance Field		Filmmaking		
Creative Arts	Film	Robert M. Fresco		Filmmaking		
Creative Arts	Film	Ernie Gehr		Filmmaking		
Creative Arts	Film	Barry Gerson	Rhode Island School of Design	Filmmaking and film sculpture		
Creative Arts	Film	Ross McElwee	Harvard University	Sherman's March		
Creative Arts	Film	Peter Rose	Philadelphia College of Art	Filmmaking		
Creative Arts	Fine Arts	John E. Alexander		Painting		
Creative Arts	Fine Arts	Carl Andre		Sculpture		
Creative Arts	Fine Arts	David Budd	School of Visual Arts	Painting		
Creative Arts	Fine Arts	Domenick Capobianco	Rutgers University	Painting and drawing		
Creative Arts	Fine Arts	Alan Cote	Bard College	Painting		
Creative Arts	Fine Arts	Michael David		Painting		
Creative Arts	Fine Arts	Stephanie Rose Frank		Painting		
Creative Arts	Fine Arts	David Hammons		Sculpture		
Creative Arts	Fine Arts	Patrick Hogan		Painting		
Creative Arts	Fine Arts	Robert Alan Israel	UC San Diego	Sculpture		
Creative Arts	Fine Arts	Joyce Eileen Kohl	University of Southern California	Sculpture		
Creative Arts	Fine Arts	Ted N. Kurahara	Pratt Institute	Painting		
Creative Arts	Fine Arts	Thomas S. Macaulay	Wright State University	Artistic perspectives in Mexico, the Middle East, and Europe		
Creative Arts	Fine Arts	John D. McCarty	George Mason University	Sculpture		
Creative Arts	Fine Arts	Tyrone Mitchell		Sculpture: Large outdoor work commissioned for Winston-Salem State University		
Creative Arts	Fine Arts	Deborah Remington	Cooper Union	Painting: Gestural works		
Creative Arts	Fine Arts	Paul Resika	Parsons School of Design	Painting		
Creative Arts	Fine Arts	Peter Harry Voulkos	UC Berkeley	Sculpture		
Creative Arts	Music Composition	Samuel H. Adler	University of Rochester	Composing		
Creative Arts	Music Composition	Martin Boykan	Brandeis University	Composing		
Creative Arts	Music Composition	Laura Clayton		Composing		
Creative Arts	Music Composition	William Finn		Composing and writing for musical theater		
Creative Arts	Music Composition	Matthew Greenbaum		Composing		
Creative Arts	Music Composition	Stephen A. Jaffe	Duke University	Composing		
Creative Arts	Music Composition	Aaron Jay Kernis		Composing		
Creative Arts	Music Composition	Eugene Joseph O'Brien	Cleveland Institute of Music (in residence)	Composing		
Creative Arts	Music Composition	Gary Smart	University of Wyoming	Composing his first symphony		
Creative Arts	Music Composition	Donald F. Wheelock	Smith College	Composing and promoting music in London	Also won in 1974	
Creative Arts	Photography	Zeke Berman	Fordham University			
Creative Arts	Photography	William Christenberry Jr.	George Washington University	Studio improvements		
Creative Arts	Photography	Lois Conner	New School for Social Research	Landscape photography in Guilin (china)		
Creative Arts	Photography	Donigan Cumming				
Creative Arts	Photography	Mary Frey	Hartford Art School	Color photos of everyday people in familiar settings		
Creative Arts	Photography	Frank Gohlke			Also won in 1975	
Creative Arts	Photography	Nancy Hellebrand	Bucks County Community College	Close-up portraits		
Creative Arts	Photography	Baldwin Lee	University of Tennessee	Lives and living conditions of Black Southerners		
Creative Arts	Photography	Barbara Norfleet	Harvard University	All the Right People, a series on the "rituals" of the wealthy		
Creative Arts	Photography	Sage Sohier				
Creative Arts	Photography	Michael Spano				
Creative Arts	Poetry	Wanda Coleman		Writing		
Creative Arts	Poetry	Douglas Crase	New York University	Writing		
Creative Arts	Poetry	Carl E. Dennis	SUNY at Buffalo	Writing		
Creative Arts	Poetry	Stephen Dunn	Columbia University (visiting)	Longer narrative poems		
Creative Arts	Poetry	John Haines		Writing	Also won in 1965	
Creative Arts	Poetry	Lawrence Kearney		Writing		
Creative Arts	Poetry	Richard L. Kenney		Writing		
Creative Arts	Poetry	Michael Ondaatje	York University	Writing		
Creative Arts	Poetry	Alicia Suskin Ostriker	Rutgers University	Writing		
Creative Arts	Poetry	Pattiann Rogers		Writing		
Creative Arts	Poetry	Roberta L. Spear		Writing		
Creative Arts	Poetry	Timothy Steele	UCLA (visiting)	Poetry writing and book on meter in modern verse		
Creative Arts	Video & Audio	Deanna Kamiel				
Creative Arts	Video & Audio	Antoni Muntadas				
Humanities	American Literature	Peter Conn	University of Pennsylvania	Essays in the cultural history of the American 1930s		
Humanities	American Literature	Lyall H. Powers	University of Michigan	Edition of Henry James' letters to Edith Wharton		
Humanities	American Literature	Neil Schmitz	SUNY at Buffalo	Civil War photographs and American literature		
Humanities	American Literature	Daniel J. Singal	Hobart and William Smith Colleges	Intellectual biography of William Faulkner		
Humanities	Architecture, Planning, & Design	Sanford Hirshen	UC Berkeley	Future of social housing design		
Humanities	Architecture, Planning, & Design	Derek Shearer	Santa Monica Planning Commission and Occidental College	Innovative urban planning practices in American cities, with an emphasis on Santa Monica, Portland, and Baltimore		
Humanities	Architecture, Planning, & Design	Richard Guy Wilson	University of Virginia	Architecture and design in Machine Age America, 1920-1941		
Humanities	Bibliography	Paul Needham	Pierpont Morgan Library	Chronology of 15th-century English printing		
Humanities	Biography	Susan Cheever		Biographical memoir of John Cheever		
Humanities	Biography	Phyllis Rose	Wesleyan University	Josephine Baker and European racial mythologies between the World Wars		
Humanities	British History	Donald H. Akenson	Queen's University	The Irish in Ontario: A Study in Rural History (published 1984) and Being Had: Historians, Evidence and the Irish in North America (published 1985)		
Humanities	British History	Michael MacDonald	University of Wisconsin-Madison	History of the mind in early modern England		
Humanities	British History	M. Jeanne Peterson	Indiana University	Secularization of the treatment of neurosis in Victorian England		
Humanities	Classics	Ernst Badian	Yale University	Demosthenes and Alexander the Great		
Humanities	Classics	Thomas J. Figueira	Rutgers University	Homosexuality in its socio-political setting in ancient Greece		
Humanities	Classics	Bruce W. Frier	University of Michigan	Roman commercial law		
Humanities	Classics	Donald J. Mastronarde	UC Berkeley	Critical edition of Euripides' Phoenissae		
Humanities	Classics	Douglass Stott Parker	University of Texas	Annotated verse translations of Aristophanes		
Humanities	Classics	John Patrick Sullivan	UC Santa Barbara	Critical biography on Martial		
Humanities	Classics	Froma I. Zeitlin	Princeton University	Role of Thebes in Athenian drama		
Humanities	Dance Studies	Roland John Wiley	University of Michigan	Marius Petipa in Russia		
Humanities	East Asian Studies	Alexander Woodside	University of British Columbia			
Humanities	Economic History	Charles S. Maier	Harvard University	US and European reconstruction after World War II		
Humanities	Economic History	Richard Charles Sutch	UC Berkeley	Savings and the accumulation of wealth in the US, 1805-1928		
Humanities	English Literature	J. Edward Chamberlin	University of Toronto	Achievement of contemporary West Indian, African, and Northern Irish poetry		
Humanities	English Literature	Ann J. Cook	Vanderbilt University	Courtship in Shakespeare and his society		
Humanities	English Literature	Jackson I. Cope	University of Southern California	Continuities of form in European drama, 1500-1800	Also won in 1958	
Humanities	English Literature	Jonathan Goldberg	Temple University	Early works of Renaissance poets		
Humanities	English Literature	N. John Hall	Bronx Community College and Graduate Center CUNY	Biography of Anthony Trollope	Also won in 1976	
Humanities	English Literature	Elizabeth K. Helsinger	University of Chicago	Sense of place in Victorian poetry		
Humanities	English Literature	Roger B. Henkle	Brown University	Imagination and form in the Victorian middle class		
Humanities	English Literature	Thomas C. Pinney	Pomona College	Rudyard Kipling	Also won in 1966	
Humanities	English Literature	Jonathan F. S. Post	UCLA	Critical study of Sir Thomas Browne		
Humanities	English Literature	David G. Riede	University of Rochester	Matthew Arnold and the betrayals of language		
Humanities	English Literature	Steven Shankman	Columbia University (visiting)	Role of Pindar in English poetry through the 18th century		
Humanities	Fine Arts Research	Albert Boime	UCLA	Social history of the 19th century	Also won in 1974	
Humanities	Fine Arts Research	Timothy James Clark	Harvard University	Avant-garde painting and sculpture in Paris, 1900-1914		
Humanities	Fine Arts Research	Linda Nochlin	Graduate Center CUNY	Women, art, and power in the later 19th century		
Humanities	Fine Arts Research	John Wesley Williams	University of Pittsburgh	Artwork in the Palatine Church of San Isidoro de León		
Humanities	Folklore & Popular Culture	Manuel da Costa Fontes	Kent State University	Portuguese folktales in North America		
Humanities	Folklore & Popular Culture	Michael Seeger		Survey of southeastern American rural music		
Humanities	French History	Patrice Louis-René Higonnet	Harvard University			
Humanities	French Literature	Charles C. Bernheimer	SUNY at Buffalo	Sexuality and narrative in 19th-century France		
Humanities	French Literature	Frederick Brown	SUNY at Stony Brook	Biography of Émile Zola	Also won in 1970	
Humanities	French Literature	Georges Claude May	Yale University	Antoine Galland's Les Mille et Une Nuits	Also won in 1950	
Humanities	General Nonfiction	Kai Bird		Biography of John J. McCloy	With Max M. Holland	
Humanities	General Nonfiction	Max M. Holland	The Nation	Biography of John J. McCloy	With Kai Bird	
Humanities	General Nonfiction	David Satter				
Humanities	General Nonfiction	Eileen Simpson		Autobiographical and psychological themes		
Humanities	German & East European History	Hermann Rebel	University of Arizona	Attempting to prove his theory that Nazism-fascism had its origins in Austria's destruction of family social relations		
Humanities	German & Scandinavian Literature	John Fuegi	University of Maryland			
Humanities	German & Scandinavian Literature	Frank Trommler	University of Pennsylvania	Decline of modernism in German literature between the World Wars		
Humanities	History of Science & Technology	Lawrence Badash	UC Santa Barbara	Biography of Ernest Rutherford		
Humanities	History of Science & Technology	William B. Provine	Cornell University	Experimental evidence for natural selection since Charles Darwin's Origin of Species		
Humanities	Iberian & Latin American History	David Patrick Geggus	University of Florida	Saint Domingue slave revolt and the rise of Toussaint Louverture		
Humanities	Iberian & Latin American History	Richard Herr	UC Berkeley	Evolution of Europe and the Americas since the 18th century		
Humanities	Iberian & Latin American History	David R. Ringrose	UC San Diego	City, country, and political economy in 19th-century Spain		
Humanities	Intellectual & Cultural History	Michael P. Adas	Rutgers University	Impact of scientific and technological superiority on European attitudes towards Africa and Asia		
Humanities	Intellectual & Cultural History	Richard C. Trexler	SUNY at Binghamton	Social history of representations of the Magi		
Humanities	Italian Literature	Anthony K. Cassell	University of Illinois	Works that provided concepts and themes found in the first canto of Dante's Inferno		
Humanities	Latin American Literature	José Luis Gómez Martínez	University of Georgia	Guillermo Francovich and Bolivian thought in the 20th century		
Humanities	Latin American Literature	C. Enrique Pupo-Walker	Vanderbilt University			
Humanities	Linguistics	Naomi S. Baron	Emory University (visiting)	Linguistics of computer languages		
Humanities	Linguistics	Shirley Brice Heath	Stanford University	Language and the American literary community		
Humanities	Literary Criticism	Robert de Beaugrande	University of Florida	Cognitive psychology and critical theory		
Humanities	Literary Criticism	Laurence S. Lockridge	New York University	Ethics and modern criticism		
Humanities	Literary Criticism	David T. Porter	University of Massachusetts Amherst	Linguistic structure and visual art		
Humanities	Medieval History	John H. Van Engen	University of Notre Dame	Lawyers, pastors, and theologians in the 12th century		
Humanities	Medieval Literature	Judson Boyce Allen		Wording the Self: Lacan and the Middle Ages		
Humanities	Medieval Literature	Donald R. Howard	Stanford University	Literary biography of Chaucer	Also won in 1969	
Humanities	Medieval Literature	C. Stephen Jaeger	Bryn Mawr College	German imperial courts in the 11th and 12th centuries		
Humanities	Music Research	Howard E. Smither	University of North Carolina, Chapel Hill	History of the oratorio, 1820-1950		
Humanities	Near Eastern Studies	Shaul Bakhash	National Humanities Center	Institutional change under Reza Shah		
Humanities	Near Eastern Studies	John A. Brinkman	University of Chicago	Tribal populations of Babylonia		
Humanities	Philosophy	Ned Block	Massachusetts Institute of Technology	Conceptual role semantics		
Humanities	Philosophy	Edwin M. Curley	University of Illinois at Chicago	Annotated translation of Spinoza		
Humanities	Philosophy	Alasdair MacIntyre	Vanderbilt University	The structure of practical reasoning according to Aristotle and Hume		
Humanities	Philosophy	Thomas A. McCarthy	Boston University	Kant, Weber, and Habermas as interpreters of modernity		
Humanities	Philosophy	Samuel Scheffler	UC Berkeley	Relation between moral theories and individual action		
Humanities	Religion	James F. Childress	University of Virginia	Love and justice in Christian social ethics, 1930-1980		
Humanities	Religion	James L. Crenshaw	Vanderbilt University	Depiction of old age in ancient Near Eastern wisdom culture		
Humanities	Religion	Michael Fishbane	Brandeis University	Literary analysis of ancient rabbinic Biblical commentaries		
Humanities	Religion	William L. Rowe	Purdue University	Philosophical examination of rationalistic theology		
Humanities	Renaissance History	Edward Muir Jr.	Syracuse University	Vendetta and civil disorder in Renaissance Italy		
Humanities	Renaissance History	Randolph Starn	UC Berkeley	Images of war and peace in Renaissance Italy		
Humanities	Russian History	Louise I. Shelley	American University	Policing in the USSR		
Humanities	Spanish & Portuguese Literature	David T. Gies	University of Virginia	Juan Grimaldi and the 19th-century Spanish theater		
Humanities	Spanish & Portuguese Literature	Henry Wells Sullivan	University of Ottawa	Love, matrimony, and desire in the theatre of Tirso de Molina		
Humanities	Theatre Arts	Walter J. Meserve	Indiana University	Dramatic literature in America, 1890-1915		
Humanities	United States History	Alan Brinkley	Harvard University	Politics and ideology in the era of World War II		
Humanities	United States History	Nancy F. Cott	Yale University	Society, politics, and gender in the US, 1870-1920		
Humanities	United States History	Don E. Fehrenbacher	Stanford University	Federal government and slavery	Also won in 1959	
Humanities	United States History	Herbert G. Gutman	Graduate Center CUNY	Gilded Age workers and the remaking of American society		
Humanities	United States History	John Higham	Johns Hopkins University	Comparative study of ethnic identities in America		
Humanities	United States History	William R. Leach	New York University	American department stores and the culture of consumption, 1870-1960		
Humanities	United States History	T. J. Jackson Lears		American advertising and American culture, 1880-1960		
Humanities	United States History	Bill C. Malone	Tulane University	Country music and the South		
Humanities	United States History	Richard L. McCormick	Rutgers University	Political corruption in the US, 1815-1840		
Humanities	United States History	Kathryn Kish Sklar	UCLA	Florence Kelley		
Natural Sciences	Applied Mathematics	Herman Z. Cummins	City College of New York and Graduate Center CUNY	Crystal phase transitions		
Natural Sciences	Applied Mathematics	Elizabeth B. Dussan V.	University of Pennsylvania	Spreading of liquids on solid surfaces		
Natural Sciences	Applied Mathematics	Ronald F. Fox	Georgia Tech			
Natural Sciences	Applied Mathematics	Jerry P. Gollub	University of Pennsylvania and Haverford College	Pattern formation		
Natural Sciences	Applied Mathematics	Nancy Kopell	Northeastern University	Nonlinear dynamics in biology		
Natural Sciences	Applied Mathematics	Charles M. Newman	University of Arizona	Stochastic models in the physical and biological science		
Natural Sciences	Applied Mathematics	Rishi Raj	Cornell University	Atom movements in stressed solids		
Natural Sciences	Applied Mathematics	Garrison Sposito	UC Riverside	Movement of toxic substances in groundwater		
Natural Sciences	Astronomy & Astrophysics	Walter H. G. Lewin	Massachusetts Institute of Technology	Analysis of data from the European X-Ray Observatory		
Natural Sciences	Astronomy & Astrophysics	John A. Simpson	University of Chicago		Also won in 1971	
Natural Sciences	Astronomy & Astrophysics	George W. Swenson Jr.	University of Illinois	Working on a new optical telescope that uses many mirrors controlled by a computer		
Natural Sciences	Astronomy & Astrophysics	Amos Yahil	SUNY at Stony Brook	Theoretical astrophysics		
Natural Sciences	Chemistry	Eric Block	SUNY at Albany	Organosulfur chemistry		
Natural Sciences	Chemistry	William H. Breckenridge	University of Utah	Research at Paris-Sud University and Max Planck Institute in Göttingen		
Natural Sciences	Chemistry	Michael P. Cava	University of Pennsylvania	Organic materials with unusual physical properties		
Natural Sciences	Chemistry	Jon Clardy	Cornell University	Isolation of biologically active compounds		
Natural Sciences	Chemistry	Kenneth B. Eisenthal	Columbia University	Rapid molecular processes		
Natural Sciences	Chemistry	Richard G. Finke	University of Oregon	Organometallic chemistry		
Natural Sciences	Chemistry	Bryan E. Kohler	Wesleyan University	Electronic structure of polyenes		
Natural Sciences	Chemistry	Charles A. McDowell	University of British Columbia	Chemical physics		
Natural Sciences	Chemistry	Josef Michl	University of Utah	Organic photochemistry theory		
Natural Sciences	Chemistry	Mary Rakowski Dubois	University of Colorado at Boulder			
Natural Sciences	Chemistry	Nicholas J. Turro	Columbia University	Magnetic effects and inorganic photochemistry		
Natural Sciences	Chemistry	Hyuk Yu	University of Wisconsin-Madison	Chain dynamics of macromolecules		
Natural Sciences	Computer Science	Oscar H. Ibarra	University of Minnesota	Systolic systems		
Natural Sciences	Earth Science	William A. Bassett	Cornell University	Nature of phase transitions in minerals		
Natural Sciences	Earth Science	G. Edward Birchfield	Northwestern University	Modelling procedures for the Pleistocene ocean		
Natural Sciences	Earth Science	R. J. Geller	Stanford University	Global seismology		
Natural Sciences	Mathematics	Michael Aizenman	Rutgers University	Critical behavior in statistical mechanics and quantum field theory		
Natural Sciences	Mathematics	Jeff Cheeger	SUNY at Stony Brook	Riemannian geometry		
Natural Sciences	Mathematics	Ronald J. DiPerna	Duke University	Generalized solutions to conservation laws		
Natural Sciences	Mathematics	Susan Montgomery	University of Southern California	Ring theory		
Natural Sciences	Mathematics	Elias M. Stein	Princeton University	Mathematical analysis	Also won in 1976	
Natural Sciences	Mathematics	Srinivasa S. R. Varadhan	New York University	Probability theory		
Natural Sciences	Mathematics	Leonid N. Vaserstein	Pennsylvania State University	Algebraic groups		
Natural Sciences	Medicine & Health	Judith Lewis Herman	Harvard University	Violence in sexual and domestic life		
Natural Sciences	Medicine & Health	Howard Rasmussen	Yale University School of Medicine	Calcium messenger system		
Natural Sciences	Medicine & Health	Douglas D. Richman	UC San Diego			
Natural Sciences	Medicine & Health	Armen H. Tashjian Jr.	Harvard University			
Natural Sciences	Molecular & Cellular Biology	Wolfhard Almers	University of Washington	New techniques to measure the motion of membrane components		
Natural Sciences	Molecular & Cellular Biology	Russell F. Doolittle	UC San Diego			
Natural Sciences	Molecular & Cellular Biology	David Eisenberg	UCLA	3D structure of proteins		
Natural Sciences	Molecular & Cellular Biology	Nicholas Wright Gillham	Duke University	Mechanisms of genetic regulation in green plants		
Natural Sciences	Molecular & Cellular Biology	Victor J. Hruby	University of Arizona	How peptides can be developed to detect central nervous system diseases, control premature labor, destroy cancer cells, and treat skin diseases		
Natural Sciences	Molecular & Cellular Biology	Richard Malkin	UC Berkeley	Electron transfer in photosynthesis		
Natural Sciences	Molecular & Cellular Biology	Charles S. McHenry	University of Texas Medical School	Aspects of how DNA reproduces itself		
Natural Sciences	Molecular & Cellular Biology	Hiroshi Nikaido	UC Berkeley	Molecular mechanisms of membrane transport in bacteria		
Natural Sciences	Molecular & Cellular Biology	Thomas D. Pollard	Johns Hopkins Medical Institutions	How actin interacts with the enzyme myosin to produce muscle movement		
Natural Sciences	Molecular & Cellular Biology	David J. Shapiro	University of Illinois	Process by which the hormone estrogen controls and enhances and expression of specific DNA sequences and genes		
Natural Sciences	Molecular & Cellular Biology	Philip J. Stephens	University of Southern California			
Natural Sciences	Molecular & Cellular Biology	Graham Charles Walker	Massachusetts Institute of Technology	Molecular mechanisms involved in nodulation		
Natural Sciences	Neuroscience	Adrian R. Morrison Jr.	University of Pennsylvania	Physiology of sleep		
Natural Sciences	Neuroscience	Philip Teitelbaum	University of Illinois	Effects of brain damage on body movement		
Natural Sciences	Organismic Biology & Ecology	Peter J. Richerson	UC Davis	Research at Duke University		
Natural Sciences	Organismic Biology & Ecology	William M. Schaffer	University of Arizona	Movements of world animal populations and how to control disease spread among them		
Natural Sciences	Organismic Biology & Ecology	Paul W. Sherman	Cornell University	Effects of kinship and demography on the social behavior of ground squirrels		
Natural Sciences	Organismic Biology & Ecology	John W. Terborgh	Princeton University	Ecology of North American migrant birds in the tropics		
Natural Sciences	Organismic Biology & Ecology	John P. Wourms	Clemson University	Embryonic development of fish		
Natural Sciences	Physics	Neil Ashcroft	Cornell University	Real space methods in the theory of condensed matter		
Natural Sciences	Physics	Gert Ehrlich	University of Illinois	Relationship of crystal growth to the properties of atoms on the surfaces of metals, and the interaction of atoms on films covering metal surfaces		
Natural Sciences	Physics	Glennys R. Farrar	Rutgers University	Theoretical physics		
Natural Sciences	Physics	Jack H. Freed	Cornell University	Low-temperature chemical physics		
Natural Sciences	Physics	M. Brian Maple	UC San Diego			
Natural Sciences	Physics	Bahaa E. Saleh	University of Wisconsin-Madison	Coherence of light		
Natural Sciences	Physics	George Stell	SUNY at Stony Brook	Analytic application of statistical mechanics		
Natural Sciences	Plant Sciences	Karl Niklas	Cornell University	Aerodynamics of wind pollination		
Natural Sciences	Plant Sciences	G. David Tilman	University of Minnesota			
Natural Sciences	Statistics	Stephen E. Fienberg	Carnegie-Mellon University	Relationship of opinion polls and the scientific method		
Social Sciences	Anthropology & Cultural Studies	Sarah C. Brett-Smith	Princeton University	Bamana sculpture and shifts in male gender identity		
Social Sciences	Anthropology & Cultural Studies	Kwang-chih Chang	Harvard University			
Social Sciences	Anthropology & Cultural Studies	Charles F. Keyes	University of Washington	Buddhist ethics and economic action in Thailand		
Social Sciences	Anthropology & Cultural Studies	Igor Kopytoff	University of Pennsylvania	Social economy of secret power		
Social Sciences	Anthropology & Cultural Studies	Elinor Ochs	University of Southern California	Culture and communicative development		
Social Sciences	Anthropology & Cultural Studies	George W. Stocking Jr.	University of Chicago			
Social Sciences	Economics	Arthur S. Goldberger	University of Wisconsin-Madison	Causal modeling and salary discrimination cases	Also won in 1972	
Social Sciences	Economics	David M. Gordon	New School for Social Research	Theoretical and historical foundations for an alternative macroeconomic model		
Social Sciences	Economics	J. Vernon Henderson	Brown University			
Social Sciences	Economics	Ronald D. Lee	UC Berkeley	Macrodemographic theory		
Social Sciences	Economics	Daniel L. McFadden	Massachusetts Institute of Technology			
Social Sciences	Economics	Peter C. B. Phillips	Yale University	Finite sample econometrics		
Social Sciences	Education	Sondra Perl	Lehman College	Ethnography of a writing teacher at work		
Social Sciences	Geography & Environmental Studies	Mark Monmonier	Syracuse University	Electronic publishing and cartography		
Social Sciences	Geography & Environmental Studies	Nigel J. H. Smith	University of Florida	Crop breeding in the Philippines, Indonesia, and Hawaii		
Social Sciences	Law	John Monahan	University of Virginia	Identification of criminal offenders		
Social Sciences	Law	William E. Nelson	New York University	History of the 14th Amendment		
Social Sciences	Law	Roger K. Newman		Biography of Hugo Black		
Social Sciences	Law	Peter H. Schuck	Yale University	Administrative and judicial implementation of the Refugee Act of 1980		
Social Sciences	Political Science	Larry Berman	UC Davis	America in Vietnam, 1966-1968		
Social Sciences	Political Science	James S. Fishkin	Yale University	Critique and reformulation of democratic theory		
Social Sciences	Political Science	Charles O. Jones	University of Virginia	The White House, Congress, and energy policy		
Social Sciences	Political Science	Michael Lipsky	Massachusetts Institute of Technology	Food policy and hunger in the US		
Social Sciences	Political Science	Samuel C. Patterson	University of Iowa	The congressional party of the 1980s		
Social Sciences	Psychology	Norman Miller	University of Southern California			
Social Sciences	Psychology	Robert A. Rescorla	University of Pennsylvania	Behavioral, neurobiological, and cognitive interpretations of learning		
Social Sciences	Psychology	Dan I. Slobin	UC Berkeley	Cognitive bases of grammatical categories		
Social Sciences	Psychology	Amos Tversky	Stanford University	Perception and representation of similarity		
Social Sciences	Sociology	Robert M. Hauser	University of Wisconsin-Madison	Social and economic achievements of siblings		
Social Sciences	Sociology	Arne L. Kalleberg	Indiana University	Work and workers in industrial societies		
Social Sciences	Sociology	Douglas J. McAdam	University of Arizona	Causes and consequences of individual activism		
Social Sciences	Sociology	Samuel H. Preston	University of Pennsylvania	Population changes		
Social Sciences	Sociology	Dennis H. Wrong	New York University	Problem of order in social theory		

== 1982 Latin American and Caribbean Fellows ==
Category	Field of Study	Fellow	Institutional association	Research topic	Notes	Ref
Creative Arts	Choreography	Graciela de Carmen Figueroa Cabezudo				
Creative Arts	Fiction	Gustavo Alvarez Gardeazábal		Writing		
Creative Arts	Fiction	Salvador Garmendia		Writing		
Creative Arts	Fine Arts	Lea Lublin	Université de Paris I	Visual art		
Creative Arts	Fine Arts	Hugo Mario de Marziani		Painting		
Creative Arts	Fine Arts	José Resende	Universidade Mackenzie	Sculpture		
Creative Arts	Music Composition	Alvaro Cordero-Saldivia		Composing		
Creative Arts	Poetry	Rubén Bonifaz Nuño	Universidad Nacional Autónoma de México	Writing poetry and studies in pre-Hispanic Mexican iconography		
Creative Arts	Poetry	Eduardo Lizalde		Writing		
Creative Arts	Poetry	Raúl Zurita		Writing		
Humanities	Architecture, Planning, & Design	Roberto Segre	Ciudad Universitaria José Antonio Echeverría	Arquitectura antillana del siglo XX (published 1996)		
Humanities	History of Science & Technology	John L. Heilbron	UC Berkeley	The Lawrence Berkeley Laboratory		
Humanities	Iberian & Latin American History	Heraclio Bonilla	Pontificia Universidad Católica del Perú			
Humanities	Iberian & Latin American History	Armando de Ramón Folch	Pontificia Universidad Católica de Chile	Studies in the urban history of Chile, 1880-1980		
Humanities	Literary Criticism	Josefina Ludmer		Problems of context in literature		
Natural Sciences	Earth Science	Ismael Ferrusquía-Villafra	Universidad Nacional Autónoma de México	Early Tertiary mammals and fossil vertebrates of Mexico		
Natural Sciences	Mathematics	João Bosco Prolla	Universidade Estadual de Campinas			
Natural Sciences	Molecular & Cellular Biology	Enrico Stefani	CINVESTAV			
Natural Sciences	Neuroscience	Fernando Garcia de Mello	Universidade Federal do Rio de Janeiro			
Natural Sciences	Neuroscience	Samuel Taleisnik	CONICET			
Natural Sciences	Organismic Biology & Ecology	Myriam Budnik	Universidad de Chile	Genetics of the colonizing process in Drosophila		
Natural Sciences	Organismic Biology & Ecology	Marc J. Dourojeanni Ricordi	National Agrarian University	Development and conservation in the Amazon		
Natural Sciences	Physics	Carlos A. Balseiro	Universidad Nacional de Cuyo	Condensed matter physics		
Natural Sciences	Physics	José Luis Morán López	Instituto Politécnico Nacional	Surface magnetism and alloy structure		
Natural Sciences	Plant Sciences	Mary T. Kalin de Arroyo	Universidad de Chile			
Social Sciences	Anthropology & Cultural Studies	Félix Báez-Jorge		Female deities of Mesoamerica		
Social Sciences	Economics	Alejandro Foxley	La Corporación de Estudios para Latinoamérica	Economic alternatives and democratization in Chile		
Social Sciences	Political Science	Carlos A. Escudé	Universidad de Belgrano and CONICET	US Policy and the economic development of Argentina, Brazil, and Chile, 1940-1955		
Social Sciences	Political Science	Wanderley Guilherme dos Santos	Instituto de Estudos Sociais e Políticos			

== See also ==
- Guggenheim Fellowship
- List of Guggenheim Fellowships awarded in 1983
- List of Guggenheim Fellowships awarded in 1985
