= List of Guggenheim Fellowships awarded in 1983 =

Two hundred and ninety-two scholars, artists, and scientists received Guggenheim Fellowships in 1983. $5,540,000 was disbursed between the recipients, who were chosen from an applicant pool of 3,571 and represented 102 different institutions. Cornell University had the most fellowship recipients on its faculty (11), followed by Harvard University and Stanford University (9 each) and University of California, Berkeley.

== 1983 U.S. and Canadian Fellows ==
Category	Field of Study	Fellow	Institutional association	Research topic	Notes	Ref
Creative Arts	Choreography	Gail S. Conrad	Gail Conrad Tap Dance Theatre	Choreographing		
Creative Arts	Choreography	Charles Moulton	Performance Space 122	Choreographing		
Creative Arts	Choreography	Paul Taylor	Paul Taylor Dance Company	Choreographing	Also won in 1961 and 1966	
Creative Arts	Choreography	Mel Wong	SUNY Purchase	Choreographing		
Creative Arts	Drama & Performance Art	Mary Gallagher		Wrote How to Say Goodbye (1986)		
Creative Arts	Drama & Performance Art	Amlin Gray	University of Wisconsin-Milwaukee	Writing three plays		
Creative Arts	Drama & Performance Art	Alev Lytle-Croutier		Writing		
Creative Arts	Drama & Performance Art	Emily Mann		Wrote Execution of Justice (1985)		
Creative Arts	Drama & Performance Art	Richard Nelson		Playwriting		
Creative Arts	Drama & Performance Art	Wendy Wasserstein		Rewrote Isn't It Romantic? (1983)		
Creative Arts	Fiction	Sheila Ballantyne		Writing		
Creative Arts	Fiction	Clark Blaise	Skidmore College	Writing	Resident Alien (published 1986)	
Creative Arts	Fiction	Richard P. Brickner	New School for Social Research	Writing		
Creative Arts	Fiction	George Cuomo	University of Massachusetts, Amherst	Writing		
Creative Arts	Fiction	Barry Hannah		Writing		
Creative Arts	Fiction	Beverly Lowry	University of Houston (visiting)	Writing		
Creative Arts	Fiction	Bobbie Ann Mason		Writing		
Creative Arts	Fiction	Ted Mooney		Writing		
Creative Arts	Fiction	Edmund White	Columbia University	Writing		
Creative Arts	Fiction	Robley Wilson	University of Northern Iowa	Writing		
Creative Arts	Film	Christopher Beaver		Fiction feature on contemporary Alaska	With Judy Irving	
Creative Arts	Film	Kenneth Lauren Burns		Filmmaking		
Creative Arts	Film	John Cohen	SUNY Purchase	Mountain Music of Peru (1984)		
Creative Arts	Film	James Blaine Dunlap		Wrote script for Night Work (1986)		
Creative Arts	Film	David Grubin		Filmmaking		
Creative Arts	Film	Judy Irving		Fiction feature on contemporary Alaska	With Christopher Beaver	
Creative Arts	Film	Daniel Reeves		New cameras; traveled to India to gather footage (later used in Sabda [1984])		
Creative Arts	Fine Arts	Lennart Anderson	Brooklyn College	Painting		
Creative Arts	Fine Arts	Stephen De Staebler	San Francisco State University	Painting and sculpture		
Creative Arts	Fine Arts	Mary Frank		Sculpture	Also won in 1973	
Creative Arts	Fine Arts	Herbert George		Sculpture		
Creative Arts	Fine Arts	Robert S. Grosvenor		Sculpture	Also won in 1970	
Creative Arts	Fine Arts	Richard Haas		Painting		
Creative Arts	Fine Arts	Marvin Harden	California State University Northridge	Painting		
Creative Arts	Fine Arts	James Hayward		Painting		
Creative Arts	Fine Arts	Michael Heizer		Sculpture		
Creative Arts	Fine Arts	Gillian Jagger	Pratt Institute	Sculpture		
Creative Arts	Fine Arts	Judy Pfaff		Sculpture		
Creative Arts	Fine Arts	George Rodart		Painting		
Creative Arts	Fine Arts	John Roloff	San Francisco Art Institute and Mills College	Sculpture		
Creative Arts	Fine Arts	Sean Scully	Princeton University	Painting		
Creative Arts	Fine Arts	Ted Stamm	School of Visual Arts	Painting		
Creative Arts	Fine Arts	Anne Tabachnick		Painting and drawing		
Creative Arts	Fine Arts	Neil Welliver	University of Pennsylvania	Painting		
Creative Arts	Fine Arts	Christopher Wilmarth		Sculpture	Also won in 1970	
Creative Arts	Fine Arts	Stephen Wood		Sculpture		
Creative Arts	Fine Arts	Ursula von Rydingsvard	Yale University	Sculpture		
Creative Arts	Music Composition	Robert Beaser		Composing	Declined award	
Creative Arts	Music Composition	Todd Brief		Composing		
Creative Arts	Music Composition	Richard Busch		Cathedral choir music and performance in England		
Creative Arts	Music Composition	Sheree Clement	Columbia University	Composing		
Creative Arts	Music Composition	Steve Lacy		Futurities		
Creative Arts	Music Composition	Thomas Oboe Lee		Composing	Also won in 1986	
Creative Arts	Music Composition	Paul Alan Levi	New York University	Composing		
Creative Arts	Music Composition	John Melby	University of Illinois Urbana-Champaign	Composing		
Creative Arts	Music Composition	Robert Sirota	Boston University	Cello Concerto		
Creative Arts	Music Composition	Judith Lang Zaimont	Peabody Conservatory	Composing a chamber opera		
Creative Arts	Music Composition	Paul Zukofsky		Production of rhythm		
Creative Arts	Photography	Kenneth W. Baird	University of Michigan	Photographic documentary of land along the Mexican-American border		
Creative Arts	Photography	Joe Deal	UC Riverside			
Creative Arts	Photography	John Harding	City College of San Francisco			
Creative Arts	Photography	Bruce Horowitz	Convalescent Hospital for Children			
Creative Arts	Photography	Terry Husebye		Photographic exploration of the Rocky Mountains		
Creative Arts	Photography	Jeff McAdory		Life in the Mississippi Delta		
Creative Arts	Photography	Cindy Sherman				
Creative Arts	Photography	Larry Sultan	San Francisco Art Institute			
Creative Arts	Photography	Anne Wilkes Tucker	Museum of Fine Arts (Houston)	History of the Photo League, 1936-1951		
Creative Arts	Poetry	Christopher Bursk	Bucks County Community College	Writing		
Creative Arts	Poetry	Stephen Dobyns	Warren Wilson College	Writing		
Creative Arts	Poetry	Rita Dove	University of Arizona	Book of poems on American Black soldiers who fought under French command during World War I		
Creative Arts	Poetry	Daniel Mark Epstein		Writing		
Creative Arts	Poetry	Reginald Gibbons	Northwestern University	Writing		
Creative Arts	Poetry	Albert Goldbarth	University of Texas at Austin	Writing		
Creative Arts	Poetry	Sam Hamill		Writing		
Creative Arts	Poetry	Susan Ludvigson	Winthrop College	Traveling, writing, and reading		
Creative Arts	Poetry	Cynthia Macdonald	University of Houston	Writing her first novel		
Creative Arts	Poetry	W. S. Merwin	Cooper Union	Writing	Also won in 1973	
Creative Arts	Poetry	Hilda Morley		Writing		
Creative Arts	Poetry	Edward Sanders		Writing		
Creative Arts	Poetry	Sherod Santos	California State University	Second book of poems		
Creative Arts	Video & Audio	Deirdre Boyle	New School for Social Research	History of independent video documentaries		
Creative Arts	Video & Audio	Tomiyo Sasaki				
Humanities	African Studies	Joseph Lelyveld	The New York Times	South African racial system		
Humanities	American Literature	Daniel Hoffman	University of Pennsylvania	Form and fable in the fiction of William Faulkner		
Humanities	American Literature	Terence Martin	Indiana University Bloomington	Significance of beginnings in American literature		
Humanities	American Literature	David E. Simpson	Northwestern University			
Humanities	Architecture, Planning, & Design	Howard Saalman	Carnegie-Mellon University	Buildings of Filippo Brunelleschi		
Humanities	Biography	Taylor Branch				
Humanities	Biography	James R. Mellow		Margaret Fuller		
Humanities	British History	Perez Zagorin	University of Rochester	Theory and practice of dissimulation in early modern Europe		
Humanities	Classics	Timothy D. Barnes	University of Toronto			
Humanities	Classics	Miroslav Marcovich	University of Illinois Urbana-Champaign			
Humanities	Classics	Chare E. Murgia	UC Berkeley	Fifth volume of the Harvard edition of Servian commentaries on Virgil		
Humanities	Classics	Alan E. Samuel	University of Toronto			
Humanities	Dance Studies	Sally Banes	SUNY Purchase	Judson Dance Theater and the avant-garde arts in Greenwich Village in the 1960s		
Humanities	East Asian Studies	Donald F. Lach	University of Chicago			
Humanities	East Asian Studies	David K. Wyatt	Cornell University	Western Indochina from the 10th to the 13th centuries		
Humanities	East Asian Studies	Pauline R. Yu	University of Minnesota			
Humanities	English Literature	Paul K. Alkon	University of Southern California			
Humanities	English Literature	Rebecca Crump	Louisiana State University	Variorum edition of the poems of Christina Rossetti		
Humanities	English Literature	Gareth W. Dunleavy	University of Wisconsin-Milwaukee	Biography of Douglas Hyde	With Janet E. Dunleavy	
Humanities	English Literature	Janet E. Dunleavy	University of Wisconsin-Milwaukee	Biography of Douglas Hyde	With Gareth W. Dunleavy	
Humanities	English Literature	Robert D. Hume	Pennsylvania State University	Early career of Henry Fielding		
Humanities	English Literature	Robert B. Martin	Princeton University	Biography of Edward FitzGerald	Also won in 1971	
Humanities	English Literature	Michael McKeon	Boston University			
Humanities	English Literature	Anne Kostelanetz Mellor	Stanford University	Critical study of Mary Shelley's life and writing	Also won in 1972	
Humanities	English Literature	Julian Moynahan	Rutgers University	Origins and development of Anglo-Irish literature		
Humanities	English Literature	John R. Reed	Wayne State University		Also won in 1970	
Humanities	English Literature	Robert K. Turner Jr.	University of Wisconsin-Milwaukee	New variorum edition of The Winter's Tale		
Humanities	English Literature	Michael John Warren	UC Santa Cruz	Comprehensive text of King Lear		
Humanities	Fine Arts Research	Norbert S. Baer	New York University	Assessment of risk associated with expanded access to cultural property		
Humanities	Fine Arts Research	Charles E. Cohen	University of Chicago	Catholic reform and religious art in northern Italy, 1512-1545		
Humanities	Fine Arts Research	Draper Hill	The Detroit News	Biography of Thomas Nast		
Humanities	Fine Arts Research	Susan L. Huntington	Ohio State University	The early Buddhist relief art of India		
Humanities	Fine Arts Research	Fred S. Licht	Boston University	Role of plaster sculpture in 17th- and 18th-century art		
Humanities	Fine Arts Research	Rose-Carol Washton Long	Queens College and Graduate Center CUNY	Edition of documents of German Expressionism		
Humanities	Fine Arts Research	James Lord		Biography of Alberto Giacometti		
Humanities	Fine Arts Research	William L. Pressly	University of Texas at Austin	British response to history painting, 1760-1850		
Humanities	Fine Arts Research	Angelica Z. Rudenstine		Conceptual and historical study of museums of modern art		
Humanities	French History	Susanna Barrows	UC Berkeley	Drink and café life in 19th-century France		
Humanities	French History	Michael R. Marrus	University of Toronto			
Humanities	French Literature	Edwin M. Duval	UC Santa Barbara	Form and meaning in Rabelais' Christian humanist epics		
Humanities	French Literature	Jane Gallop	Miami University	Critical study of Jacques Lacan's Écrits		
Humanities	General Nonfiction	Kennedy Fraser		Fashion and the self as art		
Humanities	General Nonfiction	Lawrence B. Millman	Vermont College	Book about Iceland		
Humanities	German & East European History	Christoph M. Kimmich	Brooklyn College and Graduate Center CUNY	West Germany's relations with Eastern Europe and the Soviet Union, 1966-1973		
Humanities	German & East European History	Simon M. Schama	Harvard University			
Humanities	German & Scandinavian Literature	Dagmar Barnouw	Brown University			
Humanities	German & Scandinavian Literature	Peter U. Hohendahl	Cornell University	Institution of German literature, 1848-1870		
Humanities	German & Scandinavian Literature	Winfried G. Kudszus	UC Berkeley	Franz Kafka's late stories		
Humanities	History of Science & Technology	Alan Beyerchen	Ohio State University	James Franck and the social responsibility of the scientist		
Humanities	History of Science & Technology	Joseph S. Fruton	Yale University	History of biochemical sciences		
Humanities	History of Science & Technology	Trevor Levere	University of Toronto	Science and Arctic exploration, 1818-1980		
Humanities	History of Science & Technology	Ronald L. Numbers	University of Wisconsin-Madison	History of scientific defenses of creationism in the 20th century		
Humanities	History of Science & Technology	Rosemary A. Stevens	University of Pennsylvania	American hospitals in the 20th century		
Humanities	Iberian & Latin American History	Helen Nader	Indiana University Bloomington	Estate management in early modern Spain, 1400-1750		
Humanities	Intellectual & Cultural History	James D. Wilkinson	Harvard University			
Humanities	Linguistics	Eve V. Clark	Stanford University	Acquisitional principles in word formation		
Humanities	Linguistics	Elizabeth C. Traugott	Stanford University	Semantic change		
Humanities	Linguistics	Ladislav Zgusta	University of Illinois	Anatolian place and mountain names in Turkey and Greece	Also won in 1976	
Humanities	Literary Criticism	John Felstiner	Stanford University	Holocaust poetry and the work of Paul Celan		
Humanities	Literary Criticism	Gerald Graff	Northwestern University			
Humanities	Literary Criticism	Susan Gubar	Indiana University Bloomington	Place of the woman writer in the 20th century		
Humanities	Literary Criticism	David A. Miller	UC Berkeley	The novel and the police		
Humanities	Literary Criticism	Annabel M. Patterson	University of Maryland			
Humanities	Medieval History	John W. Baldwin	Johns Hopkins University		Also won in 1960	
Humanities	Medieval History	Robert E. Lerner	Northwestern University			
Humanities	Medieval Literature	Traugott Lawler	Yale University	Edition of Chaucer's anti-matrimonial sources		
Humanities	Music Research	Margaret Bent	Princeton University	Notation of music from the late 13th to the early 16th centuries		
Humanities	Music Research	David B. Lewin	Yale University	Generalized music intervals and transformations		
Humanities	Near Eastern Studies	Clive Foss	University of Massachusetts, Boston	Urban life in the Byzantine empire		
Humanities	Philosophy	Keith Lehrer	University of Arizona	Philosophy of Thomas Reid		
Humanities	Philosophy	Brian Loar	University of Southern California			
Humanities	Philosophy	Alexander Nehamas	UC Berkeley (visiting)	The literature and the world of Nietzsche		
Humanities	Philosophy	Allen W. Wood	Cornell University	Hegel's moral philosophy		
Humanities	Religion	Harold W. Attridge	Southern Methodist University	Commentary on the Epistle to the Hebrews		
Humanities	Religion	James T. Johnson	Rutgers University	Pacifism and the just war in Western moral tradition		
Humanities	Russian History	Richard Stites	Georgetown University			
Humanities	Russian History	Ronald G. Suny	University of Michigan	Labor and social democracy in Tsarist and revolutionary Georgia		
Humanities	Science Writing	Dorothy Nelkin	Cornell University	Science, technology, and the press		
Humanities	Science Writing	Michael Ruse	University of Guelph	Research at Harvard University		
Humanities	Slavic Literature	Edward Wasiolek	University of Chicago			
Humanities	South Asian Studies	Barbara D. Metcalf	UC Berkeley	Pilgrimage to Mecca as recorded by South Asians		
Humanities	Spanish & Portuguese Literature	John W. Kronik	Cornell University	Benito Pérez Galdós and the self-conscious novel in Spain		
Humanities	Theatre Arts	Mary C. Henderson	Museum of the City of New York	View of American theater through its collaborators		
Humanities	Theatre Arts	Virginia P. Scott	University of Massachusetts, Amherst			
Humanities	Theatre Arts	J. L. Styan	Northwestern University			
Humanities	United States History	John E. Bodnar	Indiana University Bloomington	Family and work in Industrial America		
Humanities	United States History	David Brody	UC Davis	Work and leisure in America		
Humanities	United States History	Norman Dain	Rutgers University	Hostility to psychiatry in the United States, 1840-1980		
Humanities	United States History	Linda Gordon	University of Massachusetts, Boston	Family violence and social control		
Humanities	United States History	Paul Gottfried	Rockford College	Hegelianism and the postwar American Right		
Humanities	United States History	Daniel W. Howe	UCLA			
Humanities	United States History	Kenneth T. Jackson	Columbia University	US government programs and urban growth in the 20th century		
Humanities	United States History	J. Morgan Kousser	California Institute of Technology			
Humanities	United States History	James C. Mohr	University of Maryland	Medical jurisprudence in the 19th-century United States		
Humanities	United States History	Alison G. Olson	University of Maryland			
Humanities	United States History	Marc Trachtenberg	University of Pennsylvania	Strategic thought in America, 1945-1980		
Humanities	United States History	Richard White	Michigan State University			
Natural Sciences	Applied Mathematics	John Guckenheimer	UC Santa Cruz	Mathematical models of turbulence		
Natural Sciences	Applied Mathematics	Garrett M. Odell	Rensselaer Polytechnic Institute	Biomathematics		
Natural Sciences	Applied Mathematics	George C. Papanicolaou	New York University	Macroscopic properties of disordered media		
Natural Sciences	Astronomy & Astrophysics	Sidney Bludman	University of Pennsylvania	Stellar evolution and collapse		
Natural Sciences	Chemistry	Edward A. Dennis	UC San Diego	Membrane and enzyme biology		
Natural Sciences	Chemistry	Peter B. Dervan	California Institute of Technology			
Natural Sciences	Chemistry	Ernest L. Eliel	University of North Carolina, Chapel Hill	Stereochemistry of carbon compounds	Also won in 1975	
Natural Sciences	Chemistry	George E. Ewing	Indiana University Bloomington	Molecule-surface energy transfer		
Natural Sciences	Chemistry	Donald G. Fleming	University of British Columbia	Theoretical understanding of chemical reaction rates		
Natural Sciences	Chemistry	Thomas F. George	University of Rochester	Laser-induced molecular rate processes		
Natural Sciences	Chemistry	David R. Herrick	University of Oregon	Fundamental symmetry properties of atoms and molecules		
Natural Sciences	Chemistry	Brian R. James	University of British Columbia	Converting hydrocarbons into useful oxygen-containing compounds that could serve as alternate fuel supplies		
Natural Sciences	Chemistry	Geraldine A. Kenney-Wallace	University of Toronto			
Natural Sciences	Chemistry	Kyriacos C. Nicolaou	University of Pennsylvania	Total synthesis of natural products		
Natural Sciences	Chemistry	Duward Felix Shriver	Northwestern University	Structure of noncrystalline materials		
Natural Sciences	Chemistry	Peter J. Wagner	Michigan State University			
Natural Sciences	Chemistry	Steven M. Weinreb	Pennsylvania State University	Synthesis of complex organic molecules		
Natural Sciences	Chemistry	John C. Wheeler	UC San Diego	Polymerization as a critical phenomenon		
Natural Sciences	Computer Science	Martin Davis	New York University	Logical antecedents of computer science		
Natural Sciences	Computer Science	David Gries	Cornell University	Sequential and concurrent programming		
Natural Sciences	Computer Science	Hsiang-Tsung Kung	Carnegie-Mellon University	Design of computer systems		
Natural Sciences	Computer Science	Robert Langridge	UC San Francisco	Artificial intelligence and computer graphics in drug design and computer engineering		
Natural Sciences	Earth Science	Walter Alvarez	UC Berkeley	Impacts and mass extinctions		
Natural Sciences	Earth Science	A. W. Crompton	Harvard University	Control of mastication	Also won in 1976	
Natural Sciences	Earth Science	William S. Fyfe	University of Western Ontario		Also won in 1962	
Natural Sciences	Earth Science	Teh-Lung Ku	University of Southern California			
Natural Sciences	Engineering	Rakesh K. Jain	Carnegie-Mellon University	Tumor microcirculation and membrane deformation		
Natural Sciences	Mathematics	Mark J. Ablowitz	Clarkson College of Technology	Nonlinear evolution equations arising in physics		
Natural Sciences	Mathematics	Edward Formanek	Pennsylvania State University	Ring theory		
Natural Sciences	Mathematics	Roger E. Howe	Yale University	Dual pairs and the trace formula		
Natural Sciences	Mathematics	H. Blaine Lawson Jr.	SUNY at Stony Brook	Differential geometry and topology		
Natural Sciences	Mathematics	Barry C. Mazur	Harvard University	Arithmetic of elliptic curves		
Natural Sciences	Mathematics	Boris Moishezon	Columbia University	Classification of algebraic surfaces		
Natural Sciences	Mathematics	Richard P. Stanley	Massachusetts Institute of Technology	Interactions between combinatorial mathematics and representation theory		
Natural Sciences	Medicine & Health	Jerry Sebag	Harvard University	Research in Paris		
Natural Sciences	Medicine & Health	Frank Edward Stockdale	Stanford University	Protein characterization		
Natural Sciences	Molecular & Cellular Biology	Klaus Biemann	Massachusetts Institute of Technology	Structure of biologically significant large proteins		
Natural Sciences	Molecular & Cellular Biology	Richard R. Burgess	University of Wisconsin-Madison			
Natural Sciences	Molecular & Cellular Biology	William Dowhan	University of Texas Medical School at Houston	Genetic control of membrane enzyme synthesis		
Natural Sciences	Molecular & Cellular Biology	Robert M. Glaeser	UC Berkeley	Molecular mechanism of proton transport across cell membranes		
Natural Sciences	Molecular & Cellular Biology	Edward B. Goldberg	Tufts University School of Medicine			
Natural Sciences	Molecular & Cellular Biology	C. Richard Hutchinson	University of Wisconsin-Madison	Molecular genetics of antibiotic production		
Natural Sciences	Molecular & Cellular Biology	David D. Perkins	Stanford University			
Natural Sciences	Molecular & Cellular Biology	Eugene Rosenberg	Tel Aviv University	Natural role of antibiotics		
Natural Sciences	Molecular & Cellular Biology	James D. Watson	Cold Spring Harbor Laboratory	Molecular biological approach to the nervous system	Also won in 1965	
Natural Sciences	Neuroscience	Anne C. Bekoff	Colorado University	Fetal development of the neurologic system		
Natural Sciences	Neuroscience	Jerome Engel Jr.	UCLA	Relations between mood alteration and the physiology of epilepsy		
Natural Sciences	Neuroscience	Edward Taub	Institute of Behavioral Research	Deafferentation, the severing of nerves which produces a loss of feeling		
Natural Sciences	Organismic Biology & Ecology	Paul P. Feeny	Cornell University	Role of chemistry in the ecology and evolution of swallowtail butterflies		
Natural Sciences	Organismic Biology & Ecology	Biruté M. Galdikas		Conservation research at Camp Leakey		
Natural Sciences	Organismic Biology & Ecology	Philip D. Gingerich	University of Michigan	Evolution and the fossil record		
Natural Sciences	Organismic Biology & Ecology	Stephen P. Hubbell	University of Iowa	Nature of tropical rainforests and leafcutter ants		
Natural Sciences	Organismic Biology & Ecology	Jeffrey S. Levinton	SUNY at Stony Brook	Genetics, paleontology, and macroevolution		
Natural Sciences	Organismic Biology & Ecology	Jeffry B. Mitton	University of Colorado Boulder			
Natural Sciences	Organismic Biology & Ecology	Robert R. Sokal	SUNY at Stony Brook	Human migration in Europe and the evidence of blood-group distribution	Also won in 1975	
Natural Sciences	Physics	Vinay Ambegaokar	Cornell University	Quantum mechanics and statistical reasoning in physics		
Natural Sciences	Physics	Howard J. Schnitzer	Brandeis University	Research at Harvard University		
Natural Sciences	Physics	Lu Jeu Sham	UC San Diego	Theoretical condensed-matter physics		
Natural Sciences	Physics	Harry L. Swinney	University of Texas at Austin	Nonlinear dynamics		
Natural Sciences	Physics	Lincoln Wolfenstein	Carnegie-Mellon University	Theoretical and phenomenological studies in particle physics	Also won in 1973	
Natural Sciences	Plant Sciences	Annette W. Coleman	Brown University			
Natural Sciences	Statistics	Tze Leung Lai	Columbia University	Sequential statistical methods and adaptive stochastic control		
Natural Sciences	Statistics	Glenn R. Shafer	University of Kansas	Constructive probability judgment and decision theory		
Natural Sciences	Statistics	Bruce S. Weir	North Carolina State University	Statistical theories of molecular genetics		
Social Sciences	Anthropology & Cultural Studies	Thomas O. Beidelman	New York University	Moral imagination of the Kaguru of Tanzania		
Social Sciences	Anthropology & Cultural Studies	Nancy M. Farriss	University of Pennsylvania	Food in the cosmology and ecology of colonial Mesoamerica		
Social Sciences	Anthropology & Cultural Studies	Adam Kendon	Connecticut College	Sign language of the Warlpiri of central Australia		
Social Sciences	Anthropology & Cultural Studies	John V. Murra	Cornell University	Andean kingdoms and their ethnic lords		
Social Sciences	Anthropology & Cultural Studies	William C. Roseberry	New School for Social Research	Peasants and proletarians in the making of the modern world		
Social Sciences	Anthropology & Cultural Studies	Raymond T. Smith	University of Chicago			
Social Sciences	Anthropology & Cultural Studies	Melford E. Spiro	UC San Diego	Relationship between anthropology and psychoanalysis	Also won in 1976	
Social Sciences	Anthropology & Cultural Studies	Arthur P. Wolf	Stanford University	Childhood association, sexual attraction, and the incest taboo		
Social Sciences	Economics	Robert L. Heilbroner	New School for Social Research	Nature and logic of capitalism		
Social Sciences	Economics	Roger B. Myerson	Northwestern University			
Social Sciences	Economics	Roger G. Noll	California Institute of Technology			
Social Sciences	Economics	Alvin E. Roth	University of Pittsburgh	Theoretical and empirical study of matching mechanisms		
Social Sciences	Economics	Steven M. Shavell	Harvard University			
Social Sciences	Economics	John B. Taylor	Princeton University	Effects of alternative monetary and fiscal policies		
Social Sciences	Economics	Louis L. Wilde	California Institute of Technology			
Social Sciences	Education	Hazel Whitman Hertzberg	Columbia University	History of the social studies in secondary schools, 1880-1980		
Social Sciences	Education	Ira Neil Shor	College of Staten Island	Renewal of humanistic education after an age of careerism		
Social Sciences	Geography & Environmental Studies	J. Nicholas Entrikin	UCLA	Carl O. Sauer		
Social Sciences	Geography & Environmental Studies	Richard L. Morrill	University of Washington			
Social Sciences	Law	Karl E. Klare	Northeastern University			
Social Sciences	Law	Alfred S. Konefsky	SUNY at Buffalo	Biography of Simon Greenleaf		
Social Sciences	Law	G. Edward White	University of Virginia	Book about the Marshall Court		
Social Sciences	Political Science	Murray Jacob Edelman	University of Wisconsin-Madison	Construction of political issues	Also won in 1962	
Social Sciences	Political Science	Richard E. Flathman	Johns Hopkins University	Concept of political freedom		
Social Sciences	Political Science	Zvi Gitelman	University of Michigan	Citizen strategies in the Soviet administrative system		
Social Sciences	Political Science	Arend Lijphart	UC San Diego	Comparative analysis of election rules		
Social Sciences	Political Science	Kenneth Prewitt	Social Science Research Council	Governing of science in a democracy		
Social Sciences	Political Science	Kenneth A. Shepsle	Washington University in St. Louis	Institutional equilibrium		
Social Sciences	Psychology	Marc H. Bornstein	New York University	Mental representation in human infancy		
Social Sciences	Psychology	Marcia K. Johnson	SUNY at Stony Brook	Model of human memory		
Social Sciences	Psychology	Leon J. Kamin	Princeton University	Genetics, schizophrenia, and biological psychiatry		
Social Sciences	Psychology	Robert J. Lifton	Yale University School of Medicine	Nazi Holocaust and nuclear threat		
Social Sciences	Psychology	Hazel Rose Markus	University of Michigan	Cognitive analysis of the self-concept		
Social Sciences	Sociology	Robert N. Bellah	UC Berkeley	Religion and society in the US, 1880-1980		
Social Sciences	Sociology	Daniel Bell	Harvard University	Framework for analyzing the Information Revolution	Declined award	
Social Sciences	Sociology	William Josiah Goode	Stanford University	Patterns of power	Also won in 1965	
Social Sciences	Sociology	Peter Marris	UCLA	Social policy and the management of uncertainty in the US and Britain		
Social Sciences	Sociology	Alessandro Pizzorno	Harvard University			
Social Sciences	Sociology	Lenore J. Weitzman	Stanford University	Social and legal effects of divorce law reforms in England, Sweden, and the United States		

== 1982 Latin American and Caribbean Fellows ==
Category	Field of Study	Fellow	Institutional association	Research topic	Notes	Ref
Creative Arts	Drama & Performance Art	Hugo Hiriart		Writing for theatre		
Creative Arts	Fiction	Miguel Barnet		La vida real (published 1986)		
Creative Arts	Fiction	Jorge López Páez	Universidad Nacional Autónoma de México	Writing		
Creative Arts	Fiction	Carlos Sussekind de Mendonça Filho		Diary of Brazilian life		
Creative Arts	Film	Anna Bella Geiger		Filmmaking		
Creative Arts	Film	Raúl Ruiz	Institut National de l'Audiovisuel	Filmmaking		
Creative Arts	Fine Arts	Osvaldo Gomariz	Pratt Graphics Center	Painting and graphics		
Creative Arts	Fine Arts	Clever Lara	University of the Republic	Studied metal engraving at Pratt Graphics Center		
Creative Arts	Fine Arts	Pedro Pablo Pont Vergés		Painting		
Creative Arts	Poetry	Omar Lara		Writing		
Humanities	Architecture, Planning, & Design	Enrique Browne Covarrubias		Contemporary Latin American architecture		
Humanities	Film, Video, & Radio Studies	Emilio García Riera	Universidad Nacional Autónoma de México	Mexico as seen through foreign cinema		
Humanities	Fine Arts Research	Juan Fló				
Humanities	Iberian & Latin American History	Roberto Moreno y de los Arcos	Universidad Nacional Autónoma de México	History of Mexico City, 1325-1982		
Humanities	Iberian & Latin American History	Josefina Zoraida Vázquez	El Colegio de México			
Humanities	Latin American Literature	Kenneth Ramchand	University of the West Indies			
Humanities	Latin American Literature	Enrico Mario Santí	Cornell University	Intellectual biography of Octavio Paz		
Humanities	Music Research	José Miguel Wisnik	University of São Paulo	Popular music and Brazilian culture		
Humanities	Religion	Elisabeth Schüssler Fiorenza	University of Notre Dame	Commentary on the Book of Revelation		
Humanities	Spanish & Portuguese Literature	Antonio Carreño	University of Illinois, Urbana-Champaign	Lyric balladry of Luis de Góngora		
Humanities	Spanish & Portuguese Literature	Angel L. Cilveti	University of Rochester	Allegorical drama of Calderón		
Natural Sciences	Mathematics	Rolando Basim Chuaqui Kettlun	Pontificia Universidad Católica de Chile	Foundations of the concept of probability		
Natural Sciences	Mathematics	Jorge Sotomayor	Instituto Nacional de Matemática Pura e Aplicada			
Natural Sciences	Medicine & Health	Ramona Alicia Mattiazzi	Universidad Nacional de La Plata	Excitation–contraction coupling in cardiac and skeletal muscle		
Natural Sciences	Molecular & Cellular Biology & Ecology	Nelson Durán	Universidade Estadual de Campinas			
Natural Sciences	Molecular & Cellular Biology & Ecology	Gabriel Guarneros Peña	CINVESTAV	Regulation of gene expression in bacteriophage		
Natural Sciences	Neuroscience	Francisco Javier Varela	Universidad de Chile	Neurophysiological studies of human temporal visual perception		
Natural Sciences	Physics	Clicerio Avilez	Universidad Nacional Autónoma de México	High-energy physics		
Natural Sciences	Physics	Fernando Cerdeira	Universidade Estadual de Campinas	Optical studies of semiconductor microstructures		
Natural Sciences	Physics	Paulo Edmundo de Leers Costa Ribeiro	Pontificia Universidade Católica do Rio de Janeiro	Electrophysiological studies in cardiology and encephalography		
Natural Sciences	Plant Sciences	Edgardo J. Romero	University of Buenos Aires			
Social Sciences	Anthropology & Cultural Studies	René Acuña-Sandoval			Also won in 1974	
Social Sciences	Economics	Edmar Lisboa Bacha	Pontifícia Universidade Católica do Rio de Janeiro	Policy alternatives in debt-ridden developing economies		
Social Sciences	Economics	Carlos A. Rodríguez	University of CEMA			
Social Sciences	Political Science	Manuel Antonio Garretón	FLACSO	Political and social change in Latin America		

== See also ==
- Guggenheim Fellowship
- List of Guggenheim Fellowships awarded in 1982
- List of Guggenheim Fellowships awarded in 1984
