= List of neurochemists =

This is a list of neurochemists.

- David R. Brown (born 1964), American research scientist
- Michaela Jaksch-Angerer, German medical doctor
- Fernando Garcia de Mello (born 1944), Brazilian neurochemist
- David Nutt (born 1951), English neuropsychopharmacologist
- Candace Pert (1946–2013), American neuroscientist and pharmacologist
- Juda Hirsch Quastel (1899–1987), British-Canadian biochemist
- John Raymond Smythies (1922–2019), British neuropsychiatrist, neuroscientist and neurophilosopher
- Tilli Tansey, British medical historian and former neurochemist
- Johann Ludwig Wilhelm Thudichum (1829–1901), German-born physician and biochemist

== See also ==
- Neurochemistry
- List of neuroscientists
