= Wolfhard =

Wolfhard is a surname. Notable people with the surname include:

- Finn Wolfhard (born 2002), Canadian actor and musician
- Steve Wolfhard, Canadian cartoonist, storyboard artist, writer, and director

== See also ==
- Wolfhard Almers, professor emeritus at the Vollum Institute
- Wolfhard of Augsburg (1070–1127), Swabian artisan, trader, and hermit who lived around Verona
