= The Kipling Society =

The Kipling Society is a membership organisation and literary society that promotes the work of British author and Nobel laureate Rudyard Kipling (1865–1936).

Its activities include regular meetings in the UK, a programme of lectures in London, and a formal annual luncheon with a distinguished guest speaker, as well as conferences. The society publishes The Kipling Journal three times a year, and hosts a comprehensive website, which includes a reader's guide to Kipling’s works. In addition, it runs an essay writing competition for schools, answers enquiries from the public (schools, publishers and writers), and works with the media.

The society, a registered charity, (Note: The society's charity registration number is 278885.) is managed by a council and run by the society's honorary officers. Its chairman is Gary Enstone, who is the curator and executive officer of the Museum of Richmond and was, for 16 years, the house and collections manager at Kipling's former home, Bateman's in East Sussex.

== History ==
Founded in 1927 while Kipling was still alive, the Kipling Society is one of the oldest and most enduring literary societies. It was founded by J H C Brooking and a few fellow enthusiasts, including Kipling's school-friends Major General L C Dunsterville and G C Beresford, who featured in Stalky & Co. as "Stalky" and "M'Turk".

== Activities ==
The society aims to promote interest in the works, life and times of Rudyard Kipling and to act as a physical and virtual meeting place for all those interested in him; to make the archive of existing knowledge accessible through its library and website; to foster new research and to support scholarly editions of previously unpublished work.

Membership of the society is open to anyone with an interest in the life and works of Rudyard Kipling. Members receive The Kipling Journal, and have access to the Society's regular meetings and to the members’ pages of the society's website. The society holds lectures and discussions on a range of Kipling-related topics. A Rudyard Kipling discussion forum enables any member of the "Rudyard-Kipling" mailbase to exchange messages by email with everyone else on the list globally.

=== The Kipling Journal ===
The Kipling Journal, which is peer-reviewed, has been published since 1927 and is issued three times a year. In 2004 it included a previously unpublished story by Kipling, "Scylla and Charybdis", written in 1897.

=== Conferences ===
The Society organises conferences in partnership with academic institutions. These have included:

- Kipling in the News: Journalism, Empire and Decolonialism, held at City University, London in 2020.
- Kipling in America, 1892–1896, held at Marlboro College, Vermont, in 2013. This symposium on Kipling's four years in Brattleboro, Vermont after his marriage to the American Caroline Balestier, focused on the influence of Kipling's time in America on his work.
- Rudyard Kipling: an international writer, hosted by the Institute of English Studies at University of London in 2011. This coincided with the launch of The Cambridge Companion to Rudyard Kipling and many of its contributors were also speakers.
- The Kent Conference, held at the University of Kent in 2007. It was organised to mark the centenary of Kipling's Nobel Prize for Literature and was directed by Dr Jan Montefiore.
- Post-Colonial Kipling, held at Trinity College and Magdalene College, Cambridge University in 2001, a century after the publication of Kipling's novel Kim. There were four major themes – Kipling: a post-colonial assessment, Kipling and women, Kipling and film, and Kipling in translation.

=== Derogatory language policy ===
The society has developed a protocol regarding Kipling's use, in common with many of contemporary writers of his time, of terms that would now be considered derogatory in describing people in terms of their race.

== The Kipling Library ==
Kipling’s works were published in a variety of different editions during his lifetime and many of these are owned by the society's library, which holds over 1,300 items. These include a complete set of the Sussex Edition, the most complete single collection of Kipling’s works, which he edited before his death in 1936, and the Cambridge Edition of his verse, the most comprehensive collection of his poetry, edited by Thomas Pinney and published in 2013. The library contains biographies, collections of press cuttings, photographs and relevant memorabilia, critical studies and a growing set of translations of Kipling's works in other languages.

Until 2014, the Library was housed at City University, London. Most of the collection is now at Haileybury College, Kipling's old school, with some items being held at Sussex University.

== See also ==
- Bateman's, now a National Trust property, which was Kipling's home at Burwash in East Sussex for over thirty years
