= Lynn Rothschild =

Lynn Rothschild can refer to:

- Lynn Forester de Rothschild (born 1954), American-British businesswoman
- Lynn J. Rothschild (born 1957), evolutionary biologist and astrobiologist
- Lynn Schusterman, née Rothschild (born 1939), American billionaire philanthropist
