= James Turner Johnson =

James Turner Johnson (ethicist), Professor Emeritus at Rutgers University

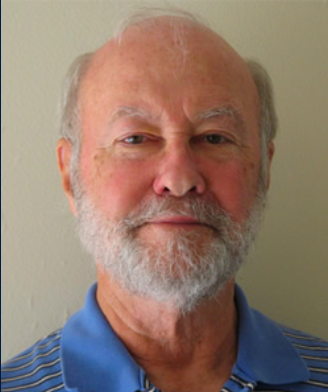
- James Turner Johnson in 2010
- Born: James Turner Johnson; November 2, 1938 (age 88); Crockett Mills, U.S.
- Occupation: Distinguished Professor Emeritus

Academic background
- Education: Brown University; Vanderbilt University; Princeton University

Academic work
- Discipline: Religious ethics
- Main interests: Just war theory, International relations
- Notable works: The Just War Tradition and the Restraint of War, Can Modern War be Just, Morality and Contemporary Warfare, Ethics and the Use of Force

James Turner Johnson (born November 2, 1938) is an American ethicist and Distinguished Professor Emeritus at Rutgers University. His most notable contributions to the field of ethics stemmed from his works in the field of Just war theory.

== Early life and education ==
Johnson was born to Georgie Maie Swanson Johnson and Walter Turner Johnson in Crockett Mills, Tennessee, on November 2, 1938.

Johnson attended elementary school in Crockett Mills, then moved with the family to Memphis, Tennessee, to attend middle school and Central High School in Memphis, Tennessee. He graduated in 1956 and was a member of the National Honor Society.

Johnson graduated from Brown University in 1960 with a degree in mathematical economics. Johnson entered the Divinity School at Vanderbilt University and graduated with a BD in 1963. From the fall of 1963 to the spring of 1965, he taught in the religion department at Newberry College.

He then pursued his doctoral studies in the Department of Religion at Princeton University, where he was mentored by Paul Ramsey. Johnson received his PhD with Distinction in the spring of 1968 and in the fall began teaching at Vassar College as a sabbatical replacement in the Department of Religion.

In 1969, Johnson moved to the Rutgers University Department of Religion.

== Work ==
Johnson is a Distinguished Professor Emeritus at Rutgers University. During his tenure, Johnson taught both undergraduate and graduate courses, covering topics such as political ethics, ethics and international affairs, the ethics of war and peace, sexuality in western religious traditions, and international law on armed conflicts, including western and Islamic traditions on statecraft and war.

He served as the General Editor of the Journal of Religious Ethics (1981–1991) and co-founded the Journal of Military Ethics, serving as its co-editor from 2001-2010. He also lectured to academic and general audiences at a variety of universities nationally and internationally and to military audiences at the United States Military Academy, the United States Naval Academy, the United States Air Force Academy, and at the Army War College and Naval War College.

Internationally, he spoke to audiences at universities in Norway, Denmark, the United Kingdom, Belgium, Germany, Italy and the Netherlands, as well as in Japan, Morocco, and Oman. In the period after the U.S. Catholic Bishops issued their 1983 Pastoral Letter, The Challenge of Peace, Johnson joined with William V. O'Brien in speaking about this letter at a variety of U. S. Catholic colleges and universities, focusing on the historical tradition of just war and its contemporary implications. Later in his career, Johnson's interests shifted towards the complexities of cross-cultural comparative thinking on morality and warfare.

Johnson is described as being "an intellectual mentor and leader for an entire generation of scholars, thinkers, and military professionals." and has a chapter devoted to his scholarship in the book Just War Thinkers from Cicero to the 21st Century. Unlike other just war scholars, Johnson's work emphasizes the historic evolution of the ethics of war within both theological and secular thinking. His scholarship maintains fidelity to the historical foundations of just war theory, dating back to Augustine of Hippo. Johnson is recognized for his ability to bring history, theology, philosophy, and international relations into meaningful conversation in thinking about the just war idea. Scholars have noted that Johnson's meticulous and comprehensive understanding of the historical tradition of just war theory, combined with his scholarship, have made him a key figure in advancing the discipline.

From his early writings on, Johnson diverged from predecessors like Paul Ramsey and Michael Walzer by stressing development of the just war idea in the Augustinian ethical tradition and the arena of international law.

In later work, at a critical historical juncture, he explored the intersection of the Western tradition of just war thinking with Islamic and other cultural perspectives on justice in war, addressing global dilemmas of statecraft between and among these cultures.

One of Johnson's most significant theoretical contributions is his framing of just war as a form of statecraft aimed at serving the common good. Loyal to the historical ethical foundations of the field, Johnson's work expanded the scope and application of just war theory.

== Awards and honors ==
Johnson has received Rockefeller, Guggenheim, and National Endowment for the Humanities (NEH) fellowships, was a Henry E. Huntington Library Research Fellow, and was a Hazel Hopkins Ford Fellow while studying at Princeton University.

Johnson has also directed two NEH summer seminars for college teachers and has been awarded numerous other research grants and awards.

Shortly before his retirement from Rutgers in 2015 he was presented with the Daniel Gorenstein Memorial Award for dedicated and exceptional service to Rutgers University

== Personal life ==
Johnson married Pamela Jane Bennett Johnson in 1968. They are parents of two children: Christopher Edward Bennett Johnson (born 1972) and Ashley Elizabeth Bennett Johnson (born 1975).

== Selected Bibliography ==
- Just War Tradition and the Restraint of War: A Moral and Historical Inquiry. Princeton and Guildford, Surrey: Princeton University Press, 1981.
- Can Modern War Be Just? New Haven and London: Yale University Press, 1984
- Cross, Crescent, and Sword: The Justification and Limitation of War in Western and Islamic Tradition. Edited with John Kelsay. New York, Westport, CT, and London: Greenwood Press, 1990.
- Just War and the Gulf War. With George Weigel. Washington, D.C.: Ethics and Public Policy Center, 1991.
- Morality and Contemporary Warfare. New Haven and London: Yale University Press, 1999.
- The War To Oust Saddam Hussein: Just War and the New Face of Conflict. New York: Rowman & Littlefield, 2005.
- Ethics and the Use of Force: Just War in Historical Perspective. Farnham, Surrey: Ashgate Press, 2011.
- Sovereignty: Moral and Historical Perspectives. Washington, D.C.: Georgetown University Press, 2014.
