= Gardeazábal =

Gardeazábal is a surname. Notable people with the surname include:

- Gustavo Álvarez Gardeazábal (born 1945), Colombian writer and politician
- Juan Gardeazábal (1923–1969), Spanish referee
