= Lynn J. Rothschild =

American evolutionary biologist, astrobiologist, and synthetic biologist

Lynn Justine Rothschild FLS
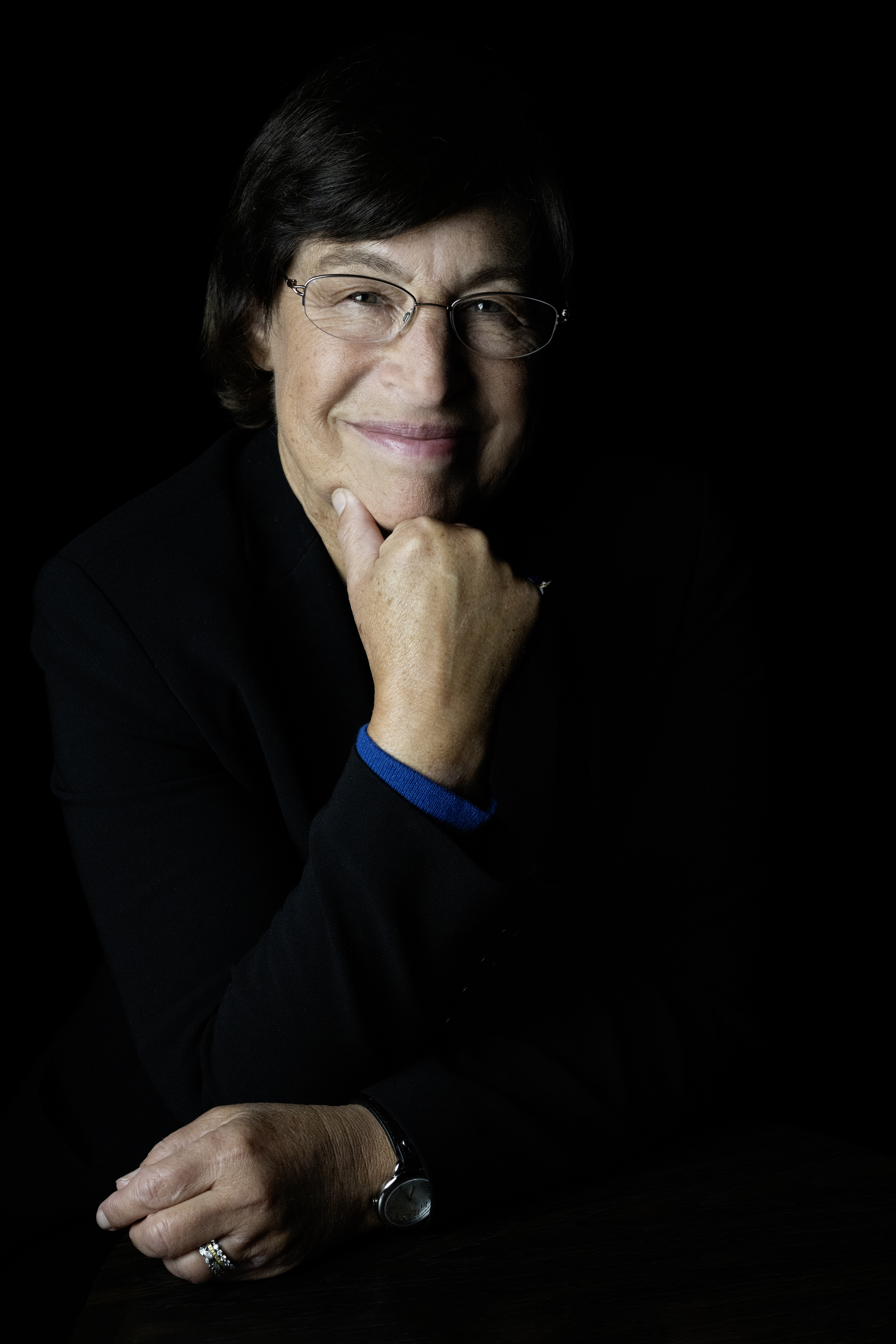
- Born: May 11, 1957 (age 69); New York, New York, United States of America
- Education: Yale University (BS), Indiana University (MA), Brown University (PhD)
- Known for: Extremophiles at NASA, and founding the synthetic biology program for NASA
- Scientific career
- Fields: Biology
- Workplaces: NASA’s Ames Research Center, Brown, Stanford, UC Santa Cruz
- Thesis: Assessment of evolutionary relationships among protistan phyla and a blue-green prokaryote by comparison of the enzyme ribulose-1,5-bisphosphate carboxylase. (1985)
- Doctoral advisor: Annette W. Coleman
- Other academic advisors: Tracy Sonneborn, Susan Gerbi

Lynn Justine Rothschild FLS (born May 11, 1957) is an evolutionary biologist, astrobiologist and synthetic biologist at NASA's Ames Research Center, and is an adjunct professor at Brown University. She is an adjunct professor at Stanford University, where she teaches Astrobiology and Space Exploration. At Ames, her research has focused on how life, particularly microbes, has evolved in the context of the physical environment, both on Earth and potentially beyond our planet's boundaries. Her research also explores the use of synthetic biology as an enabling tool for space travel. Since 2007, she has studied the effect of UV radiation on DNA synthesis, carbon metabolism and mutation/DNA repair in the Rift Valley of Kenya and the Bolivian Andes, and also in high altitude experiments atop Mount Everest, in balloon payloads with BioLaunch. She was the principal investigator of the first free-flyer synthetic biology payload which flew on the DLR EuCROPIS mission. In 2024, she received a Phase III NIAC grant to explore the use of fungi for constructing habitats on the Moon or Mars.

Rothschild graduated from Yale University in 1978 and earned a Ph.D. from Brown University in 1985. In addition to leading her research group at Ames, she serves as the Bio and Bio-Inspired Technologies, Research and Technology Lead for NASA Headquarters Space Technology Mission Directorate. Rothschild founded the Astrobiology Science Conferences and the International Journal of Astrobiology. From 2011-2019, she served a faculty Advisor for the Stanford-Brown iGEM teams, which utilized synthetic biology to advance NASA's mission objectives, including BioWires and a biodegradable drone.

== Early life and education ==
Lynn Rothschild was born on May 11, 1957, in New York City. She lived in Riverdale until the age of eight, after which her family moved to Greenwich, Connecticut. Rothschild attributes her initial interest in science to an experience in the third grade when she first looked through a microscope. Recalling this moment in an interview, she stated, "The third day I saw an amoeba, and that was it–I was hooked! So I’ve wanted to be a protozoologist literally since I was eight years old."

Rothschild was an undergraduate student at Yale University in New Haven, Connecticut, where she studied biology. During her time at Yale, she was mentored by prominent figures in the fields of phylogeny and organismal biology, including G. Evelyn Hutchinson, John Ostrom, and Willard Harman. In her junior year, she met John Preer Jr., a ciliate geneticist from Indiana University who was on sabbatical at Yale. This encounter led Rothschild to pursue a Master's degree in Zoology at Indiana University, which she completed in 1981 under the supervision of Tracy Sonneborn, a renowned protozoan geneticist. Following Sonneborn's death, Rothschild transferred to Brown University to continue her graduate studies.

At Brown, Rothschild joined the algal research lab of Annette W. Coleman, where she focused on chloroplast evolution and the isolation of RuBisCO. She earned her Ph.D. in 1985 with a dissertation titled "Assessment of evolutionary relationships among protistan phyla and a blue-green prokaryote by comparison of the enzyme ribulose-1,5-bisphosphate carboxylase." Rothschild then completed a postdoctoral fellowship at Brown in the laboratory of Susan Gerbi, where she conducted research on yeast and the evolution of ribosomal DNA.

== NASA career and research ==
After completing her postdoctoral fellowship at Brown University, Rothschild was a National Research Council Postdoctoral Fellow at NASA Ames Research Center from 1987 to 1990. During this period, she conducted fieldwork and investigated the evolution of microbial mats and carbon fixation. in 1997, Rothschild became a Research Scientist at NASA Ames and then became a Senior Scientist in the Space Sciences Branch in 2015.

=== Synthetic biology research and iGEM ===
Rothschild led the Synthetic Biology Program at NASA Ames from 2010 to 2011 and again from 2013 to 2015. She is also a member of the Build-a-Cell steering group, with interest in designing genomes and cells. In 2024, Rothschild was awarded a Phase III NIAC grant for her Mycotecture Off Planet project. This initiative focuses on leveraging fungi to create habitats for astronauts on long duration missions to the Moon and Mars. In addition to her work with mycotecture, Rothschild is also exploring the application of spore-forming bacteria to produce on demand medicine for astronauts.

Rothschild served as a faculty advisor for several Brown-Stanford teams competing in the international synthetic biology competition, iGEM. Notable projects she superviesed include:

- Synthetic biology for Mars Exploration (2011)
- Synthetic biology for astrobiology, including biomining (2012)
- Synthetic biocommunication (2013)
- Towards a Biodegradable UAS (2014), advised for the Stanford-Brown-Spelman iGEM team
- BiOrigami (2015)
- BioBalloon (2016)
- Mars: getting there and staying there (2017)
- Myco for Mars (2018), advised for the Stanford-Brown-RISD iGEM team

=== Ultraviolet radiation research ===
Rothschild has explored the impact of ultraviolet (UV) radiation on life, both on Earth and potentially on other planetary bodies. She suggests that UV radiation may have been critical in the evolution of the first eukaryotic cells and in the origin of sexual reproduction. In addition, Rothschild has written about how understanding the impact of UV radiation on microbes on Earth is important for future missions to Mars.

=== Microbial Mats and Insights in Evolutionary Biology and Astrobiology ===
Rothschild has conducted research on microbial mats, using them as models for early Earth and Martian ecosystems. One of her studies focused on carbon fixation in microbial mats located in evaporation ponds of the Ojo de Liebre Lagoon in Baja California, Mexico. These mats were selected as analogs for stromatolite fossils during the Proterozoic period due to their similar level of dissolved inorganic carbon to those predicted in ancient ocean models. The findings from this study led to the hypothesis that the decline of stromatolites might have been due to a decline in available carbon dioxide.

In addition to her work on early Earth analogs, Rothschild has explored carbon fixation in near-surface microbial communities on Earth as model ecosystems for potential extant life on Mars. Her research includes studies in the supertidal of Laguna Ojo de Liebre and small geysers in Yellowstone National Park. At Yellowstone, Rothschild investigated microbial mats living in acidic environments beneath gravel. Drawing on the characteristics of these two Earth ecosystems, Rothschild concluded that “it is not unreasonable to speculate that a near-surface community, such as the Baja and Yellowstone sites described here, might be found on Mars.”

== Awards and honors ==
Lynn Rothschild has received numerous accolades throughout her career. She has been a NASA Innovative Advanced Concepts (NIAC) fellow five times. In 2015, she was awarded the Horace Mann Medal by the Brown University Graduate School, which recognized her as "a pioneer in Astrobiology" and acknowledged her influential role in space and life science education. The same year she also received the American Humanist Association's Isaac Asimov Science Award.

Rothschild has been elected as a fellow to several organizations, including the Linnean Society of London, the California Academy of Sciences and the Explorer's Club. Additionally, she served as the president of the Society of Protozoologists from 2002 to 2003.

== Filmography ==
Rothschild has delivered several TED Talks including TEDxBeaconStreetSalon titled "The living tech we need to support human life on other planets" and TEDxSantaCruz titled "Life as we (now) know it."

In addition, Rothschild has appeared as a scientific expert in many films:

- Season one, episode four of "Expedition Deep Ocean" called "Pacific Ocean: World's Deepest" in 2021
- The fifth episode of the Youtube Original "The Age of A.I." in the episode called "How A.I. is searching for Aliens," released on January 15, 2020. She is credited as "Evolutionary and Synthetic Biology, NASA".
- Season forty six, episode twelve of "Nova" called "The Planets: Inner Worlds" in 2019
- Season one, episode four of "Living Universe" called "Contact" in 2018
- Season one, episode three of "Space's Deepest Secrets" called "Death of the Solar System" in 2016
- The movie "Do We Really Need the Moon?" released in 2011
- Season one, episode four of "Prophets of Science Fiction" called "Arthur C. Clarke" in 2011
- The first episode of the National Geographic series "Extreme Universe" called "Is Anyone Out There?" in 2010
- Season one, episode six of the Morgan Freeman narrated episode "Are We Alone" of the series "Through the Wormhole" in 2010
- Season six, episode five of "Naked Science" called "Death of the Earth" in 2009
- Season forty five, episode eight of "Horizon" called "Are We Alone in the Universe?" in 2008
- Season three, episode five of "The Universe" called "Alien Faces" in 2008
- Season five, episode four of "Naked Science" called "Birth of Life" in 2008
- The movie "If We Had No Moon" released in 1999
