= Harry Swinney =

American physicist (1939–2026)

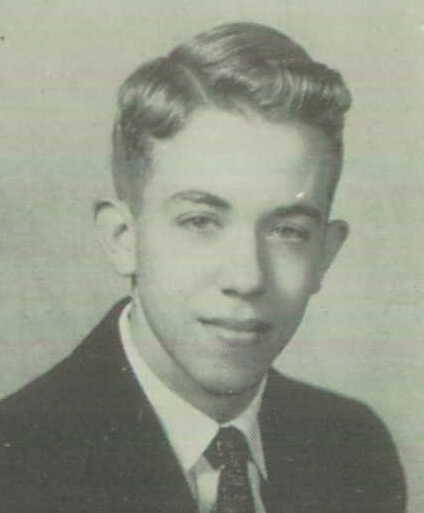
- Swinney in 1957
- Born: Harry Leonard Swinney; April 10, 1939; Opelousas, Louisiana, U.S.
- Died: July 13, 2026 (aged 87); Austin, Texas, U.S.
- Education: Southwestern at Memphis (now Rhodes College); Johns Hopkins University
- Known for: Chaos, pattern formation, and fluid dynamics experiments
- Awards: Boltzmann Medal (2013); Lewis Fry Richardson Medal (2012); Jürgen Moser Award (2007); American Physical Society Fluid Dynamics Prize (1995)
- Scientific career
- Fields: Physics
- Workplaces: New York University; City College of New York; University of Texas at Austin
- Doctoral advisor: Herman Z. Cummins

Harry Leonard Swinney (April 10, 1939 – July 13, 2026) was an American physicist noted for his contributions to the field of nonlinear dynamics.

== Early life and education ==
Harry Leonard Swinney was born in Opelousas, Louisiana, on April 10, 1939. His parents were Leonard R. Swinney and Ethel Bertheaud Swinney.

Swinney attended elementary school in Austin, Texas, and in 1957 graduated from Homer Louisiana High School. In 1961 he was awarded a B.S. with honors in physics by Southwestern at Memphis (now Rhodes College), where he was inspired by his physics professor and research mentor, Jack H. Taylor. In 1968 he was awarded a Ph.D. in physics by Johns Hopkins University; his advisor was Herman Z. Cummins.

== Career ==
Swinney was an assistant professor of physics at New York University (1971–73) and was associate professor and then professor at the City College of the City University of New York (1973–78). Since 1978 Swinney joined the faculty of the University of Texas at Austin, where he became the Sid W. Richardson Foundation Regents Chair of Physics and director of the Center for Nonlinear Dynamics. He became a professor emeritus in 2018.

== Personal life and death ==
In 1967 Swinney married Gloria T. Luyas, and in 1978 they had a son, Brent Luyas Swinney. Brent died of cancer in 1995, and Gloria died of cancer in 1997. He then married Lizabeth Kelley on August 12, 2000.

Swinney died at home in Austin, Texas, on July 13, 2026, at the age of 87.

== Honors ==
Swinney was a member of the National Academy of Sciences (1992) and a fellow of the American Physical Society (1977), the American Academy of Arts and Sciences (1991), the American Association for the Advancement of Science (1999), and the Society for Industrial and Applied Mathematics (2009). He was awarded the American Physical Society Fluid Dynamics Prize (1995), the Society for Industrial and Applied Mathematics Jürgen Moser Prize (2007), the European Geosciences Union Richardson Medal (2012), and the Boltzmann Medal (2013) of the Commission on Statistical Physics of the International Union of Pure and Applied Physics. He was a Guggenheim Fellow (1983–84) and he was inducted into The Johns Hopkins University Society of Scholars (1984). He was awarded honorary doctoral degrees by Rhodes College (2002), The Hebrew University of Jerusalem (2008), and the University of Buenos Aires (2010).

== Research contributions ==
Swinney conducted research on instabilities, chaos, and pattern formation in diverse systems, including fluid, chemical, and granular media. Swinney together with his students, postdocs, and other collaborators:

- determined the decay rate of order parameter fluctuations for fluids near the critical point
- observed a transition to chaos—deterministic yet nonperiodic behavior—in experiments on a fluid flow
- characterized chaos from time series data by computing the largest Lyapunov exponent (rate of loss of predictability) and the mutual information (general dependence of two variables)
- discovered multiple transitions to different patterns of fluid flow between concentric independently rotating cylinders
- designed a laboratory experiment that yielded a stable vortex for conditions mimicking those on Jupiter. This result provides a plausible explanation of the stability of Jupiter's Great Red Spot, which was first observed by Robert Hooke in 1664.
- observed the emergence of a spatial pattern in a chemical system, as predicted in 1952 by Alan Turing
- determined the scaling of power dissipated in strongly turbulent flow between concentric rotating cylinders
- observed anomalous diffusion and Lévy flights in a fluid flow
- discovered localized structures, dubbed "oscillons", in an oscillating granular layer; oscillons were subsequently found in many dynamical systems. The granular experiments also investigated various extended spatial patterns, shock waves, and fluctuations.
- observed resonant pattern formation with frequency locking in chemical systems
- found fractal cascades of waves on the edges of leaves, flowers, and garbage bags
- found a resonance in internal wave boundary currents generated by tidal flow on a slope; this resonance apparently selects the angle (typically three degrees) of the continental slopes of the oceans
- discovered a new protein, Slf, which is produced by neighboring colonies of Paenibacillus dendritiformis bacteria. Slf is lethal to bacteria near the edge of a colony that faces another P. dendritiformis colony.
- found that fluctuations in the number N of bacteria swimming in a volume varied as N^(3/4), in contrast to the N^(1/2) scaling of fluctuations for systems in thermodynamic equilibrium

== Other ==
Swinney, together with Rajarshi Roy and Kenneth Showalter, founded a two-week Hands-On Research in Complex System Schools for early career scientists from developing countries in 2008. The schools, sponsored by the International Centre for Theoretical Physics, have taught over 700 alumni from around the world.
