= Hazel Hertzberg =

American historian (1918–1988)

- Born: Hazel Manross Whitman; September 16, 1918; Brooklyn, New York, US
- Died: October 19, 1988 (aged 70); Rome, Italy
- Education: University of Chicago (BA); Columbia University (PhD)
- Occupation: Historian
- Employer: Teacher's College, Columbia University
- Children: Hendrik Hertzberg

Hazel Manross Whitman Hertzberg (September 16, 1918 – October 19, 1988) was an American historian. Her scholarship focused on the Indigenous people of North America. She was a professor of history and education at Teachers College, Columbia University.

== Early life and education ==
Hazel Manross Whitman was born on September 16, 1918, in Brooklyn, New York, to Grace (Wood) and Charles Theodore Whitman. She attended the University of Chicago (AB, 1958) and Columbia University (MA, 1961; PhD, 1968). While at university, she worked as an activist for sharecroppers in Mississippi, promoted the Indian independence movement, and was involved with the Socialist Party of America. She received her AB after she began teaching social studies in New York.

== Career ==
Hertzberg taught at the elementary and secondary level and worked in curriculum development. She co-wrote a seventh-grade anthropology curriculum for New York students as part of the Anthropology Curriculum Project. Later in her career, Hertzberg began writing about the history and theory of education. Her study Social Studies Reform, 1880–1980 (1981), covers the history of social studies in the United States.

Reviewing The Great Tree and the Longhouse: The Culture of the Iroquois (1966), the anthropologist Elisabeth Tooker said that, despite being written for children, it was "probably the best summary of aboriginal Iroquois culture since Henry Morgan's League of the Ho-de-no-sau-nee or Iroquois". The Search for an American Indian Identity: Modern Pan-Indian Movements (1971) discusses pan-Indianism after the Ghost Dance (from roughly the 1900s to the 1970s), covering organizations including the Society of American Indians and the Teepee Order of America.

== Personal life ==
Hazel married Sidney Hertzberg, a journalist and activist, on August 25, 1941. She and Sidney co-wrote The UN in the Age of Change, a short book on the United Nations. They had two children, including Hendrik Hertzberg. She died on October 19, 1988, in Rome, while attending a conference.
