= Howard E. Smither =

American musicologist (1925–2020)

Howard Elbert Smither (November 15, 1925, Pittsburg, Kansas – February 1, 2020, Chapel Hill, North Carolina) was an American author, musicologist and historian of music. He is the uncle of musician Chris Smither and younger brother of the late Romance Language professor William J. Smither (1916–2007).

== Education ==
He completed a BA at Hamline University in 1950; an MA followed at Cornell University in 1952.

== Career ==
He taught music at Oberlin College from 1955 to 1960, and continued at University of Kansas (1960–1963), Tulane University (1963–1968), University of North Carolina (1968–1990) and University of Cardiff (1993–1995).

He received the 1978 ASCAP-Deems Taylor Award.

He received the 1984 Guggenheim Fellowship.

== Bibliography ==
His notable books include:

- A History of the Oratorio: The Oratorio in the Classical Era
- Antecedents of the Oratorio: Sacred Dramatic Dialogues, 1600-1630
- Oratorios of the Italian Baroque
- A History of the Oratorio
