= Hendrik Hertzberg =

American journalist (born 1943)

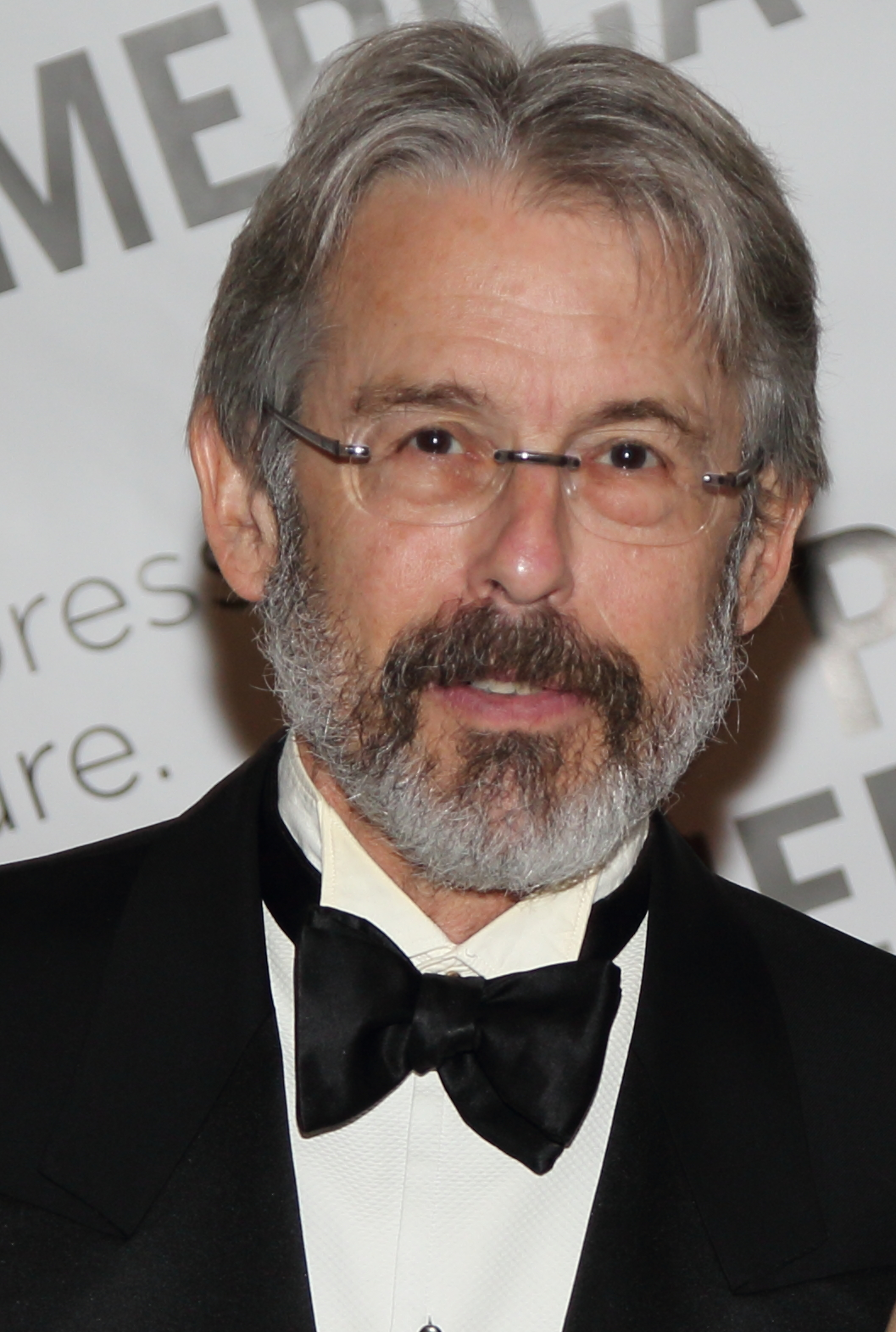
- Hertzberg at Pen America/Free Expression Literature, May 2014
- Born: July 23, 1943 (age 83); New York City, New York, U.S.
- Education: Harvard University
- Occupations: Journalist, columnist
- Spouse: Virginia Cannon (m. 1998)
- Children: 1
- Mother: Hazel Hertzberg

Hendrik Hertzberg (born July 23, 1943) is an American journalist, best known as the principal political commentator for The New Yorker magazine. He has also been a speechwriter for President Jimmy Carter and editor of The New Republic, and is the author of ¡Obámanos! The Rise of a New Political Era and Politics: Observations & Arguments. In 2009, Forbes named Hertzberg one of the "25 Most Influential Liberals in the U.S. Media," placing him at number seventeen.

== Background and education ==
Hertzberg was born in Manhattan, New York City, the son of Hazel Manross Whitman, a professor of history and education at Columbia University, and Sidney Hertzberg, a journalist and political activist. His father was Jewish (and had become an atheist); his mother was a Quaker with a Congregationalist background and of English descent, also a great-grandniece of Walt Whitman. Hertzberg was educated in the public schools of Rockland County, New York, and Harvard College, from which he graduated in 1965.

== Career ==
=== Early years ===
Hertzberg graduated from Suffern High School in Suffern, New York, after a semester as an exchange student in Toulouse, France.

He began his writing career at The Harvard Crimson and eventually served as managing editor including writing on local and national politics. In addition, he was president of the Liberal Union, had a jazz program on WHRB, and belonged to the Signet Society. Consumed by his Crimson duties, Hertzberg landed on academic probation for a semester, which required him to withdraw from all extracurricular activities. He managed to continue to write Crimson pieces anyway, under the pseudonym Sidney Hart.

William Shawn, the editor of the New Yorker, invited Hertzberg to talk about writing for the magazine. Shawn was familiar with Hertzberg's writing because his son—the actor Wallace Shawn—was a classmate of Hertzberg's at Harvard. Hertzberg declined the invitation and after graduating from Harvard in 1965 he took a draft-deferred position as editorial director for the U.S. National Student Association. The following year he joined the San Francisco bureau of Newsweek as a reporter. Hertzberg covered the rise of the hippies, the emergence of rock groups such as the Grateful Dead, Ronald Reagan's successful campaign for governor of California, and The Beatles' last concert.

In 1967 he enlisted in the United States Navy and became an officer posted in New York City. By late 1968 due to his growing opposition to the Vietnam War he requested conscientious-objector status, which was denied. He was discharged at the end of his commitment in 1969. From 1969 to 1977 Hertzberg was a staff writer for The New Yorker; Spy magazine characterized him during this period of his career as a "lothario."

=== Politics ===
During the 1976 election, Hertzberg wrote speeches for Governor Hugh Carey of New York. After the election, he was recruited to join Carter's speech writing team by James Fallows. After Fallows departed in 1979, Hertzberg became Carter's chief speechwriter. Hertzberg was an author of President Jimmy Carter's July 15, 1979, speech on energy conservation, widely known as the "Malaise Speech", and critiqued as one of the most ineffective pieces of political rhetoric in American history. The reaction by some Americans, who were suffering from high unemployment and an American industrial economy in severe recession, was that President Carter blamed them for the economic problems they were facing when they believed that Carter himself was ineffective in alleviating the recession. Others observe that calls and letters to the White House were overwhelmingly positive, and that Carter's approval rating in polls climbed 11 points. Vice President Walter Mondale predicted that the speech would not be well received. Hertzberg's personal favorite speech is Carter's farewell address of January 14, 1981. It opens with Carter declaring that he leaves the White House "to take up once more the only title in our democracy superior to that of President, the title of citizen."

As a liberal author, he also expostulates on the necessity of humanism and secularism in democratic societies and critiques the Conservative Revolution. Hertzberg believes that America's system of winner-take-all elections, federalism, and separation of powers is out of date and damaging to political responsibility and democratic accountability. Hertzberg is a frequent guest on television programs, such as Democracy Now!. In 2004, Hertzberg contributed $2,000 to John Kerry.

=== Later career ===
Hertzberg was twice editor of The New Republic, from 1981 to 1985 and then from 1989 to 1992, alternating in that job with Michael Kinsley. In between his stints as editor he wrote for that and other magazines and was a fellow at two institutes at Harvard Kennedy School, the Institute of Politics and the Joan Shorenstein Center on the Press, Politics, and Public Policy. Under his editorship The New Republic twice won the National Magazine Award for General Excellence, the magazine world’s highest honor.

In 1992, when Tina Brown became editor of The New Yorker, she recruited Hertzberg as her executive editor, and he helped her redesign and revitalize the magazine. Under Brown's successor, David Remnick, Hertzberg was a senior editor and staff writer and was a main contributor to "Comment," the weekly essay on politics and society in "The Talk of the Town" and continued until early 2014. In 2006, his articles won The New Yorker a National Magazine Award for Columns and Commentary, and in five other years (2003, 2004, 2008, 2009 and 2011) earned the magazine a Finalist ranking in the awards. From 1995 to 2018, Hertzberg was a board member of FairVote, an electoral reform organization, and continues on its advisory committee.

== Bibliography ==
=== Books ===
External videos
- Booknotes interview with Hertzberg on Politics: Observations and Arguments, 1966-2004, October 10, 2004, C-SPAN
- Presentation by Hertzberg on Politics, July 28, 2005, C-SPAN
- Interview with Hertzberg on Politics, March 25, 2006, C-SPAN
- Presentation by Hertzberg on ¡Obámanos!, November 9, 2009, C-SPAN

- Hertzberg, Hendrik (1970). One million. New York: Simon and Schuster. (Note: "One Million by Hendrik Hertzberg", goodreads.com. Retrieved 2019-06-29.)
- — (2004). Politics : observations and arguments, 1966-2004. New York: Penguin Press.
- — (2009). ¡Obámanos! : the birth of a new political era. New York: Penguin Press.

=== Articles ===
- Hertzberg, Hendrik (July 7, 2002). "Two Little Words [re: the Pledge of Allegiance]". The Talk of the Town. Comment. The New Yorker.
- — (October 6, 2002). "Manifesto [quote: 'A kind of global American military dictatorship may be for the moment something close to an unavoidable reality. But the Bush document seems to embrace it as a final end.']". The Talk of the Town. Comment. The New Yorker.
- — (December 1, 2002). "Too Much Information [re: Department of Defense's Information Awareness Office under John M. Poindexter]". The Talk of the Town. Comment. The New Yorker.
- — (February 9, 2003). "Down to Earth". The Talk of the Town. Comment. The New Yorker.
- — (June 1, 2003). "Building Nations". The Talk of the Town. Comment. The New Yorker.
- — (October 19, 2003). "Rush in Rehab". The Talk of the Town. Comment. The New Yorker.
- — (February 6, 2005). "Landmarks". The Talk of the Town. Comment. The New Yorker.
- — (August 14, 2005). "Mired". The Talk of the Town. Comment. The New Yorker.
- — (December 18, 2005). "Bah Humbug". The Talk of the Town. Comment. The New Yorker.
- — (January 7, 2007). "Comment: Desolation Rows: The execution of Saddam Hussein". The Talk of the Town. Comment. The New Yorker.
- — (September 10, 2007). "Offenses: Sen. Larry Craig". The Talk of the Town. Comment. The New Yorker.
- — (October 8, 2007). "Brouhahaha: Hillary Clinton's laugh". The Talk of the Town. Comment. The New Yorker.
- — (July 28, 2008). "Foreigners". The Talk of the Town. Comment. The New Yorker.
- — (November 3, 2008). "Like, socialism". The Talk of the Town. Comment. The New Yorker. 84 (35): 45–46.
- — (November 17, 2008). "Obama wins". The Talk of the Town. Comment. The New Yorker. 84 (37): 39–40.
- — (December 1, 2008). "Eight is enough". The Talk of the Town. Comment. The New Yorker. 84 (39): 27–28.
- — (June 22, 2009). "The Obama Effect". The Talk of the Town. Comment. The New Yorker. 85 (18): 25–26.
- — (September 21, 2009). "Lies". The Talk of the Town. Comment. The New Yorker. 85 (29): 33, 36.
- — (February 7, 2010). "And the Oscar goes to". The Talk of the Town. Comment. The New Yorker.
- — (April 26, 2010). "Eight days in April". The Talk of the Town. Comment. The New Yorker. 86 (10): 19–20.
- — (November 21, 2010). "Puppetry [re: Glenn Beck on Fox News on George Soros]". The Talk of the Town. Comment. The New Yorker.
- — (December 3, 2010). "Ask the Author Live : Hendrik Hertzberg on WikiLeaks and Iran". Page-Turner. The New Yorker. (Note: Available on website only.)
- — (December 5, 2010). "Iran and the Bomb". The Talk of the Town. Comment. The New Yorker.
- — (November 1, 2010). "Recession Election". The Talk of the Town. Comment. The New Yorker. 86 (34): 35–36.
- — (November 15, 2010). "Electoral Dissonance". The Talk of the Town. Comment. The New Yorker. 86 (36): 31–?.
- — (November 7, 2011). "Occupational Hazard". The Talk of the Town. Comment. The New Yorker. 87 (35): 23–24.
- — (December 19–26, 2011). "Alt-Newt". The Talk of the Town. Comment. The New Yorker. 87 (41): 37–38.
- — (January 16, 2012). "Close Calls". The Talk of the Town. Comment. The New Yorker. 87 (44): 19–20.
- — (January 30, 2012). "Perry's Good Idea". The Talk of the Town. Comment. The New Yorker. 87 (46): 17–18.
- — (February 13–20, 2012). "The Debate Debate". The Talk of the Town. Comment. The New Yorker. 88 (1): 31–32.
- — (December 3, 2012). "Mandate with Destiny". The Talk of the Town. Comment. The New Yorker. 88 (38): 37–38.
- — (January 7, 2013). "Shots". The Talk of the Town. Comment. The New Yorker. 88 (42): 17–18.
- — (February 4, 2013). "Walking the walk". The Talk of the Town. Comment. The New Yorker. 88 (46): 19–20.
- — (February 25, 2013). "State of the (G.O.P.) Union". The Talk of the Town. Comment. The New Yorker. 89 (2): 25–26.
- — (April 8, 2013). "Senses of entitlement". The Talk of the Town. Comment. The New Yorker. 89 (8): 23–24.
- — (April 22, 2013). "The Thatcherist". The Talk of the Town. Comment. The New Yorker. 89 (10): 31–32.
- — (October 21, 2013). "Impeach Obama!". The Talk of the Town. Comment. The New Yorker. 89 (33): 27–28.
- — (November 1, 2015). "That G.O.P. debate : two footnotes". News Desk. The New Yorker.
- — (August 29, 2022). "Everywhere's somewhere". The Talk of the Town. January 8, 1972. The New Yorker. 98 (26): 12, 14, 16. (Note: Originally published in the January 8, 1972 issue.) (Note: Online version is titled "John and Yoko take Manhattan".)

———————

== Personal life ==
Hertzberg is married to Virginia Cannon, a former Vanity Fair editor and a current New Yorker editor. They have a son, Wolf.
