= Michaela Jaksch-Angerer =

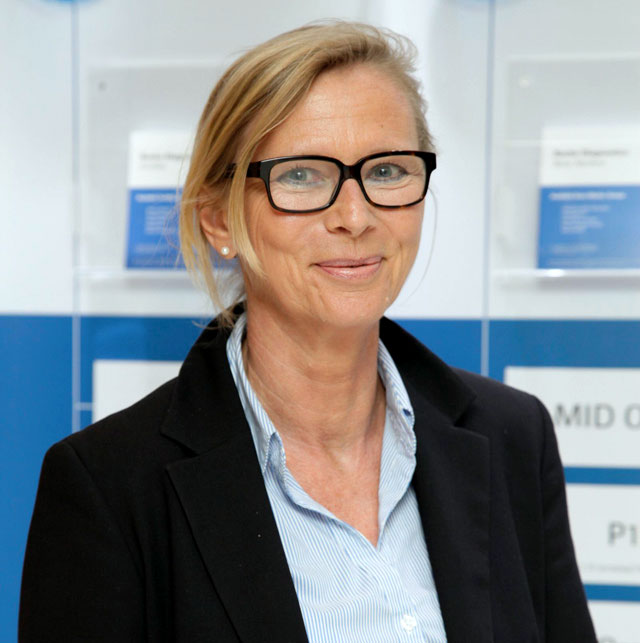
- Michaela Jaksch-Angerer
- Born: 4 September 1961 (age 64); Bavaria, Germany
- Known for: Causes of Cytochrome c Oxidase Deficiency
- Scientific career
- Fields: Neurobiochemistry, Autoimmunology, Metabolic Diseases, Laboratory Medicine and Mitochondrial Genetics

Michaela Jaksch-Angerer is a German medical doctor, consultant in laboratory medicine, and Associate Professor (PD Dr. med) for Clinical Chemistry. She has held the position of "Managing and Medical Director" since 2004 at the Freiburg Medical Laboratory Middle East LLC, Dubai, UAE, a member of Synlab since 2013. FML was founded in 2002 as a joint venture of the University of Freiburg Germany and the Al Abbas Group, Dubai, UAE.

== Biography ==
Jaksch-Angerer studied medicine at LMU Munich. After her doctoral thesis in Immunology 1993, she specialized in Laboratory Medicine (Fachaerztin, 2000). Her research strongly focused on Mitochondrial Genetics (1994-2007), with several awarded original articles out of more than 50 peer reviewed publications. She habilitated (PD Dr. med. habil.) in Clinical Chemistry in 2003, with the research work ‘causes of cytochrome c oxidase deficiency’ at the LMU Munich. In the same year, she was listed for the first position for the professorship of Neuro-biochemistry at the Carl Gustav Carus Technical University in Dresden, Germany. She was also elected by the Freiburg University for the position of the Managing and Medical Director at FML Dubai, UAE in 2003.

== Awards ==
FML was the first medical laboratory in the Middle East receiving the accreditation according to the high standard ISO 15189 from the German accreditation body DAkkS in 2008. Since 2004, FML provides special and highly sophisticated diagnostic testing in the region onsite, as well as with a network of experts and with Synlab. She is also the recipient of two research awards from DMG, Freiburg, Germany. She also contributed many books, including the Encyclopedia of Molecular Mechanisms of Disease.

== Selected publications ==
- Jaksch, M.; Paret, C.; Stucka, R.; Horn, N.; Müller-Höcker, J.; Horvath, R.; Trepesch, N.; Stecker, G.; Freisinger, P. (2001-12-15). "Cytochrome c oxidase deficiency due to mutations in SCO2, encoding a mitochondrial copper-binding protein, is rescued by copper in human myoblasts". Human Molecular Genetics. 10 (26): 3025–3035. doi:10.1093/hmg/10.26.3025. ISSN 0964-6906. PMID 11751685.
- Jaksch, M.; Ogilvie, I.; Yao, J.; Kortenhaus, G.; Bresser, H. G.; Gerbitz, K. D.; Shoubridge, E. A. (2000-03-22). "Mutations in SCO2 are associated with a distinct form of hypertrophic cardiomyopathy and cytochrome c oxidase deficiency". Human Molecular Genetics. 9 (5): 795–801. doi:10.1093/hmg/9.5.795. ISSN 0964-6906. PMID 10749987.
- Jaksch, M.; Klopstock, T.; Kurlemann, G.; Dörner, M.; Hofmann, S.; Kleinle, S.; Hegemann, S.; Weissert, M.; Müller-Höcker, J. (October 1998). "Progressive myoclonus epilepsy and mitochondrial myopathy associated with mutations in the tRNA(Ser(UCN)) gene". Annals of Neurology. 44 (4): 635–640. doi:10.1002/ana.410440409. ISSN 0364-5134. PMID 9778262. S2CID 22812462.
- Jaksch, M.; Horvath, R.; Horn, N.; Auer, D. P.; Macmillan, C.; Peters, J.; Gerbitz, K. D.; Kraegeloh-Mann, I.; Muntau, A. (2001-10-23). "Homozygosity (E140K) in SCO2 causes delayed infantile onset of cardiomyopathy and neuropathy". Neurology. 57 (8): 1440–1446. doi:10.1212/wnl.57.8.1440. ISSN 0028-3878. PMID 11673586. S2CID 24920023.
