= Rishi Raj =

University professor

Professor Rishi Raj
- Born: 21 July 1943 (age 82); India
- Education: Allahabad University, University of Durham (BS), Harvard University (PhD)
- Occupation: Professor
- Employer(s): Paul M Rady Mechanical Engineering, University of Colorado Boulder
- Known for: Flash Sintering
- Spouse: Jyotsna Raj
- Website: https://www.colorado.edu/lab/raj-rishi/rishi-raj

Rishi Raj (born 21 July 1943) is an Indian university professor at the University of Colorado Boulder, and the pioneer of flash sintering technology and research.

== Academic background ==
Raj left India at the age of eighteen after completing a two-year program in mathematics, chemistry and physics at Allahabad University. He proceeded to the University of Durham in England where he obtained a bachelor of science degree in electrical engineering with First Class Honors.

In 1965, Raj commenced his doctoral studies at Harvard University and obtained a Ph.D. in applied sciences in 1970 under the mentorship of Michael F. Ashby and David Turnbull

== Career ==
Rishi worked briefly at Standard Telephones and Cables (1964–1965) as a staff engineer, where he worked on Concorde control systems. Immediately after his doctoral studies, Rishi Raj joined Chase Brass and Copper Company in Cleveland and worked there for a year before joining the University of Colorado Boulder as an assistant professor of mechanical engineering. He thereafter moved to the Materials Science Department at Cornell University in 1976. Raj returned to the Department of Mechanical Engineering at the University of Colorado Boulder in 1996 after spending 21 years at Cornell University.

== Academic publications ==
Raj has published significantly in ceramics, first on their mechanical properties, and the processing of oxides and non-oxides at high temperature. His work at Boulder was initially focused on the unusual properties and nanostructure of polymer-derived-ceramics and influence of electric fields on defects phenomena in ceramics at high temperature. In 2010, Raj and his students – Marco Cologna and Boriana Rashkova – discovered the flash sintering technology which has been applied to different materials including ceramics, oxides, semiconductors, electronic conductors, ionic conductors and insulators. In November 2023, Rishi alongside his doctoral student, Emmanuel Bamidele and two others published the application of flash sintering method to tungsten, a first report of flash sintering in metals. The published report showed an unprecedented sintering of tungsten under a minute to a final density between 97 and 100% at room temperature. The work has been repeated on nickel and has been published in the same journal. Rishi Raj has been cited more than 30 000 times and has contributed more than 500 academic publications to knowledge. Few of the notable publications of Rishi Raj include:

- On grain boundary sliding and diffusional creep
- Intergranular Fracture at Elevated Temperature.
- Creep in polycrystalline aggregates by matter transport through a liquid phase
- Development of a processing map for use in warm-forming and hot-forming processes
- Joule Heating during flash sintering
- Flash-sintering of cubic yttria-stabilized zirconia at 750 °C for possible use in SOFC manufacturing

== Flash sintering discovery ==
Raj and his students first published a work on flash sintering in the Journal of the American Ceramic Society where they showed that yttrium-stabilized zirconia can be sintered in a few seconds at a furnace temperature of ~850°C to full density. The advantage of this technique over other sintering techniques is the short time to achieve full density and the lower furnace temperature. Since its publication, flash sintering it has garnered over 1272 citations funded by government agencies, private organizations and academic institutions all over the world. Flash sintering has been described as "the most significant discovery in the field of Ceramics over the last twenty-five years, with both scientific and technological implications for the coming decades". It has been commercialized by Lucideon Limited since 2012
