= Sidney Hertzberg (journalist) =

American journalist

- Born: January 30, 1910; New York City, United States
- Died: December 18, 1984 (aged 74); Pomona, New York, United States
- Occupation: Journalist
- Spouse: Hazel Whitman Hertzberg (m. 1941)
- Children: 2

Sidney Hertzberg (30 January 1910 - 18 December 1984) was an American journalist known for his interactions with Mahatma Gandhi and Jawaharlal Nehru and for being sympathetic to the Quit India Movement. He worked as the national publicity director of the America First Committee in 1939 and was as a special correspondent for The Hindustan Times from 1950 to 1956.

== Career ==
Hertzberg begun his career as a copy boy for The New York Times in 1929 and worked as a general assignment reporter for the Time magazine. In 1936, he campaigned for the presidential campaign of the Socialist candidate Norman Thomas. From 1947 to 1948, he was a regional representative of the United Nations Appeal for Children in the Far East region of Asia. He had also worked for the Liberal Party of New York as public relations director in 1956 and for the League for Industrial Democracy from 1957-1958 as an executive director. From 1965-1967, he worked as the editorial director of Consumer Reports (formerly Consumers Union). He also founded the magazine Current in 1959. He worked as a freelance editor for CBS and the Ford Foundation. He had done educational reprints for Life.

During the The Emergency issued by Indira Gandhi, he was one amongst the 80 Americans who appealed to India to restore their respective freedoms.
