= Gustavo Álvarez Gardeazábal =

Colombian writer, and politician

66th Governor of Valle del Cauca
- In office 1 January 1998 – 28 July 1999
- Preceded by: Germán Villegas Villegas
- Succeeded by: Juan Fernando Bonilla

Personal details
- Born: 31 October 1945 (age 80) Tuluá, Valle del Cauca, Colombia
- Education: University of Valle (BA, 1970)
- Profession: Writer

Gustavo Álvarez Gardeazábal (born 31 October 1945) is a Colombian writer and politician. He attended the University of Valle and was the runner-up for a Premio Nadal in 1971 for Dabeiba. He was awarded a Guggenheim Fellowship in 1984, and was Governor of Valle del Cauca Department from 1998 to 1999. He also wrote the highly rated telenovela El Bazar de los Idiotas. He is one of the few atheists to hold public office in Colombia.
