= Josefina Ludmer =

Argentinean writer (1939-2016)

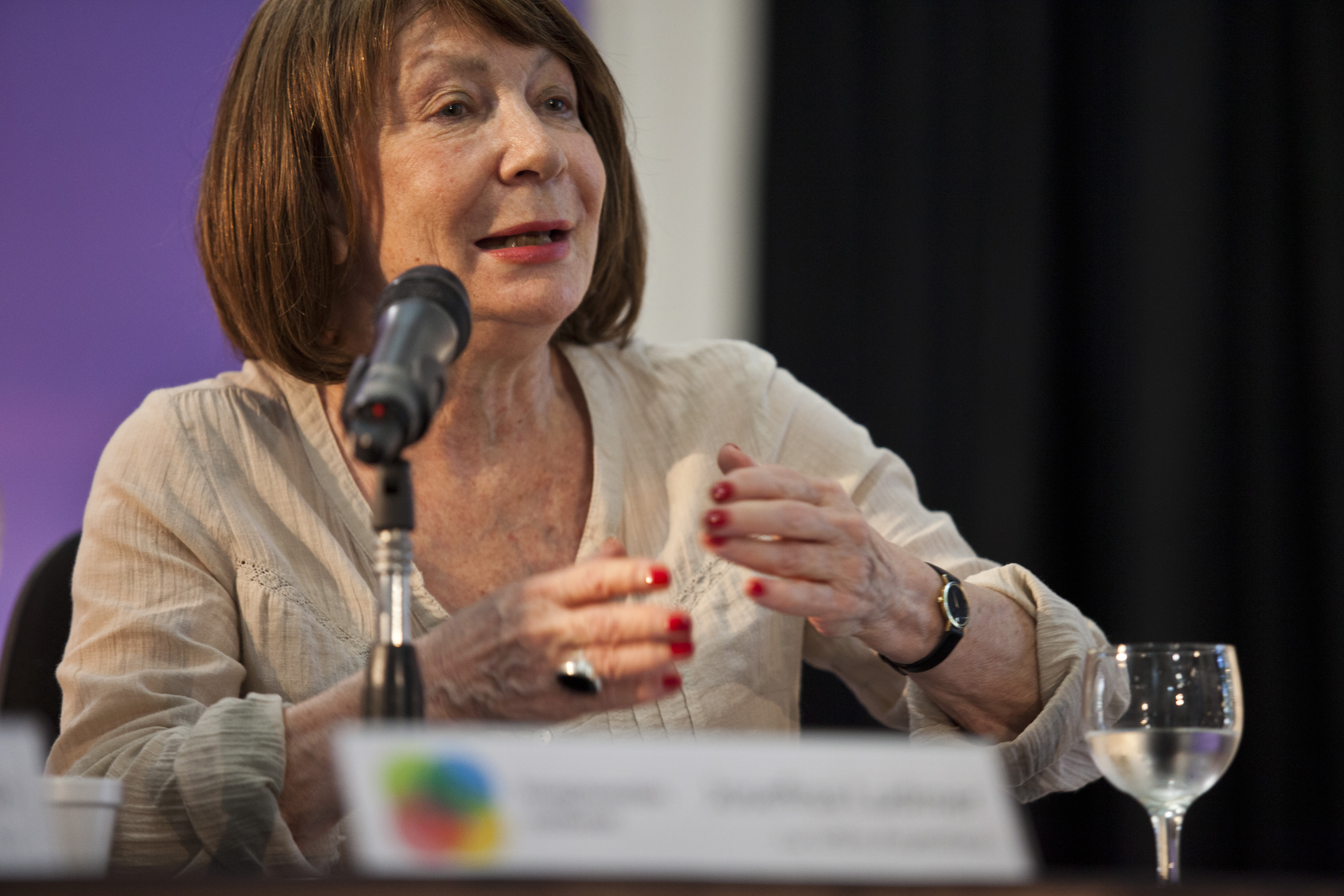
- Josefina Ludmer in 2014
- Born: May 3, 1939; San Francisco (Córdoba)
- Died: December 10, 2016 (aged 77); Buenos Aires
- Occupations: professor, essayist, writer, and literary critic
- Known for: Books: El género gauchesco. Un tratado sobre la patria (1988), translated as The Gaucho Genre: A Treatise on the Motherland (2002); and El cuerpo del delito. Un manual (1999), translated as The Corpus Delicti: A Manual of Argentine Fictions (2004)
- Parent(s): Beile Nemirovsky; Natalio Ludmer
- Awards: Guggenheim Fellowship, 1984; Konex Platinum Prize (Linguistic Theory and Literature), 2016; Doctor Honoris Causa, University of Buenos Aires, 2010.

Academic background
- Education: University of Rosario

Academic work
- Discipline: Literary critic
- Sub-discipline: Latin American literature
- Institutions: Yale University, University of Buenos Aires

Josefina Ludmer (San Francisco, Córdoba – May 3, 1939; Buenos Aires, December 10, 2016) was an Argentinian professor, essayist, writer, and literary critic. She was a professor at the University of Buenos Aires (1984–1991) and later at Yale University (1988–2005), specializing in Latin American literature.
