= Rose-Carol Washton Long =

American art historian (born 1938)

- Born: March 1, 1938 (age 88); New London, Connecticut, U.S.
- Occupation: Art historian
- Awards: Guggenheim Fellow (1983)

Academic background
- Education: Wellesley College; Yale University

Academic work
- Discipline: Art history
- Sub-discipline: German expressionism; Wassily Kandinsky
- Institutions: Queens College, City University of New York; CUNY Graduate Center

Rose-Carol Washton Long (born March 1, 1938) is an American art historian and Professor Emeritus of Art History at CUNY Graduate Center.

Born in New London, Connecticut, Long started off as a lecturer and research fellow at the Solomon R. Guggenheim Museum and got her PhD in 1968 at Yale University while working as a lecturer in art history at Queens College, City University of New York, where she would eventually become professor emeritus. A 1983 Guggenheim Fellow, she specializes in German expressionism and Wassily Kandinsky, and has written on both subjects, including the books Kandinsky: The Development of an Abstract Style and German Expressionism: Documents from the End of the Wilhelmine Empire to the Rise of National Socialism.

== Biography ==
Rose-Carol Washton was born on March 1, 1938, in New London, Connecticut. She was one of the three daughters of Alice (née Gordon) and Abram A. Washton (né Watchinsky), a Jewish Columbia-educated lawyer in New London who was chair of the city's Democratic Town Committee and boxed for the Dartmouth Big Green.

After graduating from New London High School with high honors in 1955, Long obtained her BA at Wellesley College in 1959. After getting her MA at Yale University in 1962, she worked at the Solomon R. Guggenheim Museum as a lecturer and research fellow from 1964 until 1967. She returned to Yale to get her PhD in Fine Arts in 1968; her dissertation, Vasily Kandinsky, 1909–1913: Painting and Theory, in which Kandinsky's widow Nina was interviewed, was supervised by Robert L. Herbert.

In 1967, Long began working at Queens College, City University of New York as a lecturer in art history, and was promoted to assistant professor in 1969. She began working at CUNY Graduate Center in 1971 and was a National Endowment for the Humanities Fellow for the 1972-1973 period. She was promoted to associate professor in 1979 and professor in 1984. She retired from teaching in the early-2010s, and she was promoted to professor emeritus. She was president of the Historians of German and Central European Art and Architecture when they became a College Art Association affiliate in 1997.

As an academic, Long specializes in German expressionism and Wassily Kandinsky. In 1980, she wrote the book Kandinsky: The Development of an Abstract Style. She was appointed a Guggenheim Fellow in 1983, for "an edition of documents of German Expressionism." In 1995, she published German Expressionism: Documents from the End of the Wilhelmine Empire to the Rise of National Socialism, a book on the German expressionism movement during the Weimar era, as part of UC Press' Documents of Twentieth Century Art series. She has also written academic articles, essays, and chapters on Kandinsky and German expressionism, served as an anthology editor, and appeared as an interviewee on the 2017 BBC Radio documentary Kandinsky and the Russian Revolution.

On March 28, 1970, she married Carl D. Long, then a management consultant at Touche Ross; they were married until his death in January 2000. She and her partner, playwright Walter Corwin, live in the Manhattan neighborhood of Chelsea. She is also a member of The New Shul, a non-denominational synagogue in the West Village.

== Bibliography ==
- Kandinsky: The Development of an Abstract Style (1980)
- German Expressionism: Documents from the End of the Wilhelmine Empire to the Rise of National Socialism (1995)
