= Paul Ramsey (ethicist) =

American Christian ethicist (1913–1988)

- Born: Robert Paul Ramsey; December 10, 1913; Mendenhall, Mississippi, U.S.
- Died: February 29, 1988 (aged 74); Princeton, New Jersey, U.S.
- Resting place: Princeton Cemetery, Princeton, Princeton, New Jersey, U.S.
- Occupation: Christian ethicist
- Relatives: Anne Ramsey (Cousin)

Academic background
- Education: Millsaps College; Yale University

Academic work
- School or tradition: Methodist
- Main interests: Bioethics; Just war theory

Robert Paul Ramsey (December 10, 1913 – February 29, 1988) was an American Christian ethicist of the 20th century. He was a Methodist and his primary focus in ethics was medical ethics. The major portion of his academic career was spent as a tenured professor at Princeton University until the end of his life in 1988. His most notable contributions to ethics were in the fields of Christian ethics, bioethics, just war theory and common law.

== Life ==
Paul Ramsey undertook his doctoral studies at Yale where he was mentored by H. Richard Niebuhr. He subsequently taught Christian Ethics at Princeton. Ramsay has been credited with laying the intellectual foundations of bioethics and informed consent through his book The Patient as Person, which has continued to be a standard text in medical ethics across multiple editions. His book Basic Christian Ethics has been used as a seminary book for decades, but his greatest impact on social thought came through his examination of medical issues, such as abortion, euthanasia and genetic control. He has been credited with re-introducing just war theory into Protestant ethical reflection.

== Education and teachings at Princeton ==
Ramsey earned his bachelor's degree from Millsaps College, and both his bachelor of divinity and doctorate from Yale University.

He became a Professor of History and Social Sciences at his alma mater, and then served as an assistant Professor of Christian ethics at Garrett Bible Institute.

In 1944, Ramsey joined the faculty at Princeton University as the Harrington Spear Paine Professor of Religion.

He was elected a member of the Institute Of Medicine in 1972 for his contributions to the field of bioethics.

== Death ==
After teaching at Princeton for almost 40 years, Ramsey died from a heart attack at the age of 74 at the Penn Medicine Princeton Medical Center.

== Views ==
=== Bioethics ===
Ramsey aligned himself with deontologial normative theories, rather than the Roman Catholic teachings of relative autonomy of natural law and morality. He has addressed the concepts of abortion, health care, organ donation, informed consent, and fetal experimentation.

In 1972 Ramsey wrote an article for the Journal of the American Medical Association in which he strongly opposed in vitro fertilization, declaring that it "constitutes unethical medical experimentation on possible future human beings, and therefore, it is subject to absolute moral prohibition."

== Notable works ==
=== Basic Christian Ethics (1950) ===
Basic Christian Ethics is one of Ramsey's most famous contributions to Christian ethics. It has been one of the most prominent theology books used in the education system and provides Ramsey's insights into the basic morals and values of Christianity. It is a comprehensive look into the field of Christian ethics and presents what it means to think in a combination of theology and ethics.

=== The Patient as Person: Explorations in Medical Ethics (1970) ===
The Patient as Person: Explorations in Medical Ethics is a book written by Ramsey centered around biomedical ethics. He discusses the ethical principle of consent in the medical field and the care of those already dying. He also discusses the medical actions and ramifications of organ donation, tying into the topic of consent. This book considers more deeply health care and the benefits allocated to each individual depending on needs. This book gained renown for its ability to tackle controversial topics while providing scrutinizing theories that question the relationship and confidentiality of the patient and physician.

=== The Ethics of Fetal Research (1975) ===
The Ethics of Fetal Research discusses Ramsey's views on the action of experimentation done on fetuses, particularly those that are still alive. This book examines both drug experimentation and testing, as well as discusses the foundations and fundamentals of moral medical policies.

=== The Essential Paul Ramsey (1994) ===
The Essential Paul Ramsey is a collection of Ramsey's papers, edited by William Werpehowski and Stephen D. Crocco. Selections deal with such issues as race relations, sexuality and marriage, war, the meaning of Christian love, abortion, and medical care for the sick and dying.

== Bibliography ==
- Basic Christian Ethics (1950)
- War and the Christian Conscience: How Shall Modern War Be Conducted Justly? Durham, North Carolina 1961
- Nine Modern Moralists, Prentice Hall, 1962
- Deeds and Rules in Christian Ethics, University of America Press 1967.
- The Case of the Curious Exception in Gene Outka and Paul Ramsey eds. Norm and context in Christian Ethics, New York 1968.
- The Just War: Force and Political Responsibility, New York 1968
- Fabricated Man
- The Ethics of Fetal Research, New Haven: Yale University Press, 1975.
- Doing evil to achieve good : moral choice in conflict situations, Loyola University Press, Chicago, 1978, OCLC 4498788 (with Richard A. McCormick, S.J.)
- The Patient as Person. Explorations in medical ethics, March 1970, New Haven, Connecticut
- The Essential Paul Ramsey
- Ethics at the Edges of Life, New Haven: Yale U.P., 1980.
- Speak Up for Just War or Pacifism. A Critique of the United Methodist Bishops' Pastoral Letter "In Defense of Creation" Pennsylvania State University Press, 1988

=== Secondary literature ===
- Michael C. McKenzie, Paul Ramsey's Ethics: The Power of 'Agape' in a Postmodern World (Westport: Praeger, 2001).
- Kevin Carnahan, Reinhold Niebuhr and Paul Ramsey: Idealist and Pragmatic Christians on Politics, Philosophy, Religion, and War (2010).
- Adam Hollowell, Power and Purpose: Paul Ramsey and Contemporary Christian Political Theology (Eerdmans, 2015).
