= Crockett Mills, Tennessee =

- Unincorporated community
- Location within Tennessee Location within the United States
- Coordinates: 35°52′03″N 89°10′09″W
- Country: United States
- State: Tennessee
- County: Crockett
- Established: 1867
- Elevation: 348 ft (106 m)
- Time zone: UTC-6 (Central (CST))
  - Summer (DST): UTC-5 (CDT)
- ZIP code: 38021
- Area code: 731
- GNIS feature ID: 1269501

Crockett Mills is an unincorporated community in Crockett County, Tennessee, United States. Its ZIP code is 38021.

Crockett Mills was heavily influenced by founder J.F. Robertson. Originally named Robertsonville, the town's name was eventually changed to Crockett Mills because of the town's three mills: a saw mill, a flour mill, and a handle mill. The first school in Crockett Mills was named after Robertson and J.C. Hamlett, Robertson's partner. Today the former school building serves as the Crockett Mills Community Center.
