= Herman Z. Cummins =

American physicist (1933–2010)

Herman Z. Cummins (April 23, 1933 in Rochester New York – April 21, 2010 in New York City) was an experimental physicist and Distinguished Professor Emeritus of the City College of New York.

He studied at Ohio State University, at the University of Paris, and at Columbia University. After a postdoc with Charles Townes at Columbia Radiation Laboratory, he pursued the tenure track at Johns Hopkins University. In 1971 he returned to New York, where he hold from 1974 to 2004 a Distinguished Professorship at the City College. He was awarded an Alexander von Humboldt Senior Research Award (1998-2003) and a Docteur Honoris Causa of the University Pierre et Marie Curie, Paris (1999).

Starting in 1963, Cummins was among the first to use laser light scattering for the systematic investigation of condensed matter. He soon concentrated on ferroelectrics. In the 1980s he started to study growth processes and the dynamics of viscous liquids. In close collaboration with theorist Wolfgang Götze, he provided experimental support for the mode-coupling theory of structural relaxation.
