= Thomas Pinney =

American English scholar

Thomas Pinney (born April 23, 1932) is an American English scholar known for his work collecting the letters of Thomas Babington Macaulay and Rudyard Kipling, as well as a wine scholar known for his two-volume history of wine in the U.S. He is an emeritus professor of English at Pomona College in Claremont, California, having previously held the Spalding Professor and William M. Keck Distinguished Service Professor endowed chair and been chair of the department.

== Legacy ==
Upon his retirement in 1997, Pinney's colleague and poet, Robert Mezey wrote a poem entitled "On the retirement of scholar, Thomas Pinney," paying tribute to Pinney's intellectual breadth and humor. This poem was later published in Mezey's Collected Poems, 1952-1999.

His papers related to research into the California wine industry are held at California State Polytechnic University Pomona Archives. His papers on Baron Thomas Babington Macaulay are held at the Huntington Library.

== Works ==
- A History of Wine in America: From the Beginnings to Prohibition. Berkeley: University of California Press. 1989. ISBN 978-0-520-06224-5.
- A History of Wine in America: From Prohibition to the Present. Berkeley: University of California Press. 2005. ISBN 978-0-520-94148-9.
- Kipling and his First Publisher: Correspondence of Rudyard Kipling With Thacker, Spink and Co., 1886–1890, Thomas Pinney and David Alan Richards, eds., High Wycombe, Bucks.: Rivendale Press, 2001.
- The Makers of American Wine. Berkeley: University of California Press. 2012. ISBN 978-0-520-26953-8
- The City of Vines: a History of Wine in Los Angeles. Heyday Books. 2017. ISBN 978-1-59714-398-1. [Winner of the 2016 California Historical Society Book Award]
- Kipling down under : Rudyard Kipling's visit to Australia, 1891 : a narrative with documents. Thomas Pinney and Rosalind Kennedy, eds.2000. ISBN 978-0738825229
- Rudyard Kipling's uncollected speeches : a second book of words : with a checklist of his speeches. Thomas Pinney, ed. ELT Press. 2008. ISBN 978-0944318249
- Rudyard Kipling : something of myself and other autobiographical writings. Thomas Pinney, ed. Cambridge University Press. 1990.
- The Cambridge edition of the poems of Rudyard Kipling. Thomas Pinney, ed. Cambridge University Press. 2013. ISBN 978-1107019140
- The Letters of Rudyard Kipling. vol. 1-6. 1990-2004. Palgrave Macmillan, University of Iowa Press.
- Rudyard Kipling’s Letters to His Agents, A. P. Watt and Son, 1889–1899. Thomas Pinney, ed. ELT Press. 2016. ISBN 978-0944318775
