= Fernando Garcia de Mello =

Fernando Garcia de Mello (born July 1944) is a neurochemist from Brazil. He obtained his degree in Biochemistry in 1968 from the State University of Rio de Janeiro. Fernando Mello started his scientific training as an undergraduate student at the Brazilian National Institute of Cancer, and later at the Institute of Biophysics from the Federal University of Rio de Janeiro, being mentored by Firmino de Castro, which greatly influenced him to have a more humanistic approach towards the students that he would train. It was only during his post-doc period (1973-1976) at the National Institutes of Health under supervision of Marshall Warren Nirenberg that Mello began his research in Neurochemistry, using the embryonary Retina as a model for his investigations.

Mello made contributions to neurochemistry by investigating the embryonic development of the chicken retina. His works led to the characterization of new transmitters, mechanisms of action, alternative synthesis pathways and plasticity events. He was also a pioneer in the demonstrations that showed a morphogenic property of neurotransmitters along the development of the Central nervous system, i.e that neurotransmitter coordinate the maturation of neural cells.

== S• The GABAergic system ==
Mello first investigations focused on the GABAergic system. During his time at the NIH, Mello found an inconsistency between the levels of GABA in early stages of embryonic retina development and the activity of the enzyme known to synthesize this neurotransmitter, Glutamate decarboxylase. This led him to hypothesize the existence of an alternative synthesis pathway for GABA. Indeed, through collaborative works with other researchers, he found that putrescine represents a major source for GABA in initial stages of retina development, and decreases along it, giving space to Glutamate Decarboxylase.

Years later, de Mello also discovered that GABA regulates Glutamate Decarboxylase through the activation of GABAA receptor, establishing a new regulation mechanism for this transmitter system. Besides, it was also discovered that in the embryonary chick retina, GABA is majorly released through a carrier-mediated mechanism, which contrast with the current paradigm of the time that neurotransmitter's release occurs exclusively through a vesicular-mediated mechanism.

== • Dopaminergic system ==
Much of the initial works of Mello in neurochemistry focused in the identification of Dopamine as a neurotransmitter in the chicken retina. He demonstrated that dopamine evokes accumulation of Cyclic adenosine monophosphate in both the isolated tissue or in cultured cells derived from the embryonary retina. His works also led to the establishment of the concept that neurotransmitters system desensitize along the development due downregulation of its receptors. The most prestigious works of Fernando Garcia de Mello concerning dopamine focused in the discovery of a transient D1 Dopamine Receptor that appears during the retina development and regulates it, establishing dopamine as an active participant in early stages of CNS development.

Mello also contributed to the discovery of an interaction between Dopamine and NMDA receptor, establishing a link between dopaminergic and glutamatergic system and paving hypothesis for diseases such as Schizophrenia, in which both neurotransmitters are deregulated.

== Chagas Filho Institute of Biophysics ==
Mello was one of the greatest contributors to the development of one of the most renowned neuroscience's centers in the world: Carlos Chagas Filho Institute of Biophysics.

He was director of the Institute twice and coordinated the Laboratory of Neurochemistry until 2015, when he retired and gave his chair to Ricardo Augusto de Melo Reis.
