= Wolfhard Almers =

American biophysicist

Wolfhard Almers is a professor emeritus at the Vollum Institute and a member of the U.S. National Academy of Sciences. He is known for his work on the biophysics of endocytosis and exocytosis.

== Early life and education ==
Almers completed his undergraduate studies at the Free University of Berlin, then moved to the United States for graduate studies at Duke University and the University of Rochester. He completed his PhD in physiology in 1971. Following his PhD, Almers was a postdoctoral researcher at Cambridge University for three years.

== Career ==
In 1974, Almers was recruited to join the faculty of the University of Washington's Department of Physiology and Biophysics as an assistant professor, eventually rising to the rank of professor in 1984. He joined the Max-Planck Institute in 1992. In 1995, Almers moved to the University of Heidelberg as a member of its Faculty of Biology. in 1999, Almers moved to the Vollum Institute in the role of senior scientist. He was named professor emeritus in 2016.

Almers has been a member of the U.S. National Academy of Science since 2006.

== Research ==
Almers is known for his work on the biophysics of endocytosis and exocytosis.
