= Annette W. Coleman =

American biologist (1934–2023)

Annette W. Coleman (1934 – July 10, 2023) was an American biologist. She was a Stephen T. Olney Professor Emerita of Natural History at Brown University, where she was a faculty member in the Department of Molecular Biology, Cell Biology and Biochemistry. Coleman was raised in Des Moines, Iowa, and spent part of her early life in New York City, including college. She earned her B.S. in botany from Barnard College in 1955 and completed her Ph.D. in phycology, botany, and genetics at Indiana University in 1958, with time also spent conducting research at Woods Hole, Massachusetts.

== Biography ==
Coleman's work examines "...the nature, quantity and mode of distribution of DNA genomes of mitochondria and plastids," as well as "...the species problem, how separate species evolve. The work examines particular species and genera of the volvocales, freshwater green algae, brown algae, and abalones, and the analysis includes mating compatibility, chromosome number, and DNA relatedness as determined by sequencing."

Coleman attended Barnard College, graduating with an A.B. in 1955, and earned her doctorate in plant science at Indiana University in 1958. She was a Guggenheim Fellow in natural sciences and plant sciences in 1983.

== Selected works ==
=== Books ===
- Coleman, A. W.; Goff, L. J.; Stein-Taylor, J. R. (1989), Algae as Experimental Systems, Wiley-Liss.

=== Book chapters ===
- Coleman, A. W.; Proschold, T. (2005), "Control of sexual reproduction in algae in culture", in Andersen, R. A. (ed.), Algal Culturing Techniques, vol. 41, Academic Press, p. 906, Bibcode:2005JPcgy..41..906L, doi:10.1111/j.1529-8817.2005.00114.x.
- Goff, L. J.; Coleman, A. W. (1990), "DNA: Microspectroflurometric studies", in Cole, K. M.; Sheath, R. G. (eds.), Biology of the Red Algae, Cambridge University Press.

=== Journal papers ===
- Corriveau, Joseph L.; Coleman, Annette W. (1988), "Rapid screening method to detect potential biparental inheritance of plastid DNA and results for over 200 angiosperm species", American Journal of Botany, 75 (10): 1443–1458, doi:10.2307/2444695, JSTOR 2444695.
- Melaragno, J. E.; Mehrotra, B.; Coleman, A. W. (1993), "Relationship between endopolyploidy and cell size in epidermal tissue of Arabidopsis", The Plant Cell, 5 (11): 1661–1668, doi:10.1105/tpc.5.11.1661, PMC 160394, PMID 12271050.
- Coleman, Annette W. (2003), "ITS2 is a double-edged tool for eukaryote evolutionary comparisons", Trends in Genetics, 19 (7): 370–375, doi:10.1016/S0168-9525(03)00118-5, PMID 12850441.

== Awards ==
- The Herrman Botanical Prize
- The Luigi Provasoli Award in 1986 for her paper titled "The Role of Secondary Pit Connections in Red Algal Parasitism."
- Darbaker Award in 1986 for her findings in microscopical algae.
