= List of University of California, San Diego people =

The list of University of California, San Diego people includes notable graduates, professors and administrators affiliated with the University of California, San Diego in the United States.

== Notable alumni ==
=== Art and architecture ===
- Lizet Benrey, BA (Visual Arts), contemporary artist
- Micha Cárdenas, MFA (Visual Arts), 2009, contemporary artist
- Joyce Cutler–Shaw, MFA (Visual Arts), 1972, multidisciplinary artist
- Moyra Davey, MFA (Photography), 1988, contemporary artist
- Micol Hebron, did not graduate, contemporary artist
- Hung Liu, MFA (Visual Arts), 1986, contemporary artist
- Elle Mehrmand, MFA (Visual Arts), 2011, contemporary artist
- Jesse Mockrin, MFA, 2011, contemporary artist
- Margaret Noble, BA (Philosophy), 2002, conceptual artist and sound artist
- Dan Santat, BS (Microbiology), 1998, author and illustrator, winner of 2015 Caldecott Medal

=== Athletics ===
- Geoff Abrams, MD (Medicine), 2006, tennis player
- Mark Allen, BS (Biology), 1980, six-time Ironman Triathlon World Champion, inducted into the Ironman Hall of Fame; named the world's fittest man by Outside magazine
- Billy Beane, BA (Economics), 1985, general manager of the Oakland Athletics
- Randy Bennett, BS (Biology), 1986, Saint Mary's College of California men's basketball head coach
- Lynn Kramer, BS (Engineering), 1989, champion slalom racer and 2024 Skateboarding Hall of Fame inductee
- Alon Leichman, BS (History), 2016, Olympian, member of the Israel national baseball team, and assistant pitching coach for the Cincinnati Reds
- Jie Li, BA (Political Science), 2006, winner of the US ING Cup, Open, Costen, Texas Open and many other championships
- Shlomo Lipetz, BA (International Relations), 2005, Israeli baseball player
- Bob Natal, BS (Computer Science), 1987, MLB catcher, Montreal Expos, Florida Marlins National League
- Mike Saipe, Major League Baseball pitcher
- Julie Swail, BA (Economics), 1995, Olympian (women's water polo); UC Irvine head coach
- Shay Whitcomb, BA (International Business), 2019, MLB infielder

=== Business ===
- Garrett Gruener, BS (Political Science), 1976, co-founder of Ask Jeeves
- Josh Harris, BA (Communications), founder of JupiterResearch and Pseudo.com, a live audio and video webcasting website founded in 1993
- Gary E. Jacobs, BA (Management Science), 1979, businessman and minority owner of the Sacramento Kings
- Greg Papadopoulos, BA (Systems Science), 1979, executive VP and CTA of Sun Microsystems
- Robert J. Pera, MS (Electrical Engineering), 2002, founder of Ubiquiti Networks, owner of the Memphis Grizzlies
- Michael Robertson, BS (Cognitive Science), 1989, founder of MP3.com, Lindows.com, and SIPphone
- Philip Rosedale, BS (Physics), 1992, founder and CEO of Linden Lab, creator of virtual 3D world Second Life
- Jason Snell, BA (Communications), 1992, editorial director of Mac Publishing and editor of Macworld
- Nick Woodman, BA (Visual Arts), 1997, founder and CEO of GoPro

=== Computer science ===
- Bill Atkinson, BS (Chemistry), 1974, co-developer of the Macintosh computer
- Ryan Dahl, BS (Mathematics), 2003, inventor and original author of Node.js
- Michael I. Jordan, PhD (Cognitive Science), 1985; Distinguished Professor of EECS at UC Berkeley
- David E. Shaw, BS (Mathematics), 1972, founder of D. E. Shaw & Co.
- Guy "Bud" Tribble, BS (Physics), 1975, principal architect of the original Macintosh computer and co-founder of NeXt, Inc.

=== Film, theatre, and television ===
- Beth Accomando, BA (Communications), 1982, film critic
- Ngozi Anyanwu, MFA (Acting), 2013, television actor and Humanitas Award-winning playwright
- Yareli Arizmendi, MFA (Acting), 1992, actor in Like Water for Chocolate
- James Avery, BA (Theatre), 1976, stage, screen and television actor who co-starred with Will Smith on the TV show Fresh Prince of Bel Air
- Rachel Axler, MFA (Playwriting), 2004, Emmy Award-winning writer for The Daily Show and Parks and Recreation
- David Barrera, MFA (Acting), 1994, ALMA Award-nominated actor for 24
- Quincy Tyler Bernstine, MFA (Acting), 1999, Obie Award-winning actor, Tony Award nominee
- Marsha Stephanie Blake, MFA (Acting), 2001, Emmy Award-nominated actor for When They See Us
- Hart Bochner, BA (Theatre), 1979, film actor, notably of Breaking Away
- Robert Buckley, BS (Economics), 2003, actor, best known for One Tree Hill
- Danny Burstein, MFA (Acting), 1990, Tony Award-winning actor, three-time Grammy Award nominee
- Zoë Chao, MFA (Acting), 2011, actress and star of several televisions shows and films
- Ricardo Chavira, MFA (Acting), 2000, actor, notably of Desperate Housewives
- Charlet Chung, BA (Communications), 2006, voice actor, notably of Overwatch
- Steve Cosson, MFA (Directing), 2001, Obie Award-winning artistic director of The Civilians
- Benicio del Toro, did not graduate, actor, notably of Traffic
- Maria Dizzia, MFA (Acting), 2001, Tony Award nominee In the Next Room (or The Vibrator Play)
- Emily Donahoe, MFA (Acting), 2004, Obie and Helen Hayes award-winning actor
- Mary Catherine Garrison, MFA (Acting), 1999, series regular on Somebody Somewhere
- Johnny Ray Gill, MFA (Acting), 2010, series regular on Underground and BrainDead
- Michael Greif, MFA (Directing), 1985, director of Rent and former artistic director of La Jolla Playhouse, three-time Tony Award nominee
- Matt Hoverman, MFA (Acting), 1996, Daytime Emmy Award-winning writer
- Zora Howard, MFA (Acting), 2017, Pulitzer Prize for Drama finalist for STEW
- Marceline Hugot, MFA (Acting), 1985, Broadway and film actor.
- Daniel Humbarger, BA (Urban Studies), 2006, stand-up comedian
- Naomi Iizuka, MFA (Playwriting), 1992, author of over two dozen plays, including Language of Angels
- Chane't Johnson, MFA (Acting), 2001, television and film actor; coach of Denzel Whitaker
- Ty Granderson Jones, MFA (Acting), 1982, film and television actor with credits including Con Air
- Mike Judge, BS (Physics), 1985, animator and director best known for Beavis and Butt-Head, Office Space, King of the Hill, and Silicon Valley; graduation speaker for the class of 2009
- Anne Kauffman, MFA (Directing), 1999, Obie Award-winning director
- Sagan Lewis, MFA (Acting), 1977, series regular on St. Elsewhere
- Melanie Marnich MFA (Playwriting), 1998, writer for Big Love, Jerome Fellowship from The Playwrights' Center, and Golden Globe winner
- Jefferson Mays, MFA (Acting), 1991, Tony Award winner, I Am My Own Wife
- Silas Weir Mitchell, MFA (Acting), 1995, character actor and star of Grimm
- Owiso Odera, MFA (Acting), 2005, actor on The Originals, Lortel Award nominee
- Toby Onwumere, MFA (Acting), 2015, star of Sense8
- Joy Osmanski, MFA (Acting), 2003, most notable credits include Duncanville and Santa Clarita Diet
- Neil Patel, MFA (Scenic Design), 1991, Broadway designer of Side Man, winner of Obie and Helen Hayes awards
- Jeanne Paulsen, MFA (Acting), 1978, Tony Award nominee, The Kentucky Cycle
- Dileep Rao, BA (Theatre), 1995, film actor in Avatar, Inception
- PJ Raval, BA (Visual Arts Media), filmmaker
- Maria Striar, MFA (Acting), 1995, founder and artistic director of Clubbed Thumb
- Caridad Svich, MFA (Playwriting), 1988, Obie Award for Lifetime Achievement
- Michael Swaim, BA (Theatre), 2007, actor, comedian, filmmaker, podcaster
- Milana Vayntrub, BA (Communication), 2008, actress, comedian, and writer
- Kellie Waymire, MFA (Acting), 1993, best known for Star Trek: Enterprise and roles on Six Feet Under, and One Life to Live
- John Wesley, MFA (Acting), 1977, actor known for roles on The Fresh Prince of Bel-Air and Martin
- Wong Fu Productions filmmaking trio: Wesley Chan, Ted Fu, and Philip Wang, BA (Cinematography), 2006
- Jimmy O. Yang, BS (Economics), 2009, actor and stand-up comedian, best known for Silicon Valley and Patriots Day
- Lauren Yee, MFA (Playwriting), 2012, Whiting Award winner, produced at Playwrights Horizons and Atlantic Theatre Company
- Paloma Young, MFA (Costume Design), 2006, Tony Award winner, Peter and the Starcatcher

=== Journalism ===
- Mona Kosar Abdi, BA (International Relations), 2011, multimedia journalist with WSET ABC 13, the Al Jazeera Media Network
- Katie Hafner, BA (German Literature), 1979

=== Law and politics ===
- Jessica Caloza, BA (International relations), California state assemblywoman
- Nicola T. Hanna, BA, JD, 1984, U.S. attorney for the Central District of California
- Jacqui Irwin, BS, Systems Engineering, United States House of Representatives, District 42, 2026. California State Assembly, 2014-2026
- Steve Peace, BA (Political Science), 1976, California state senator, 40th Senate District, chair of the Senate Budget and Fiscal Review Committee; producer of the 1970s cult film Attack of the Killer Tomatoes
- Timothy J. Roemer, BA (Government), 1979, former Indiana congressman and current president of the Center for National Policy
- John Shoven, BA (Physics), 1969, Hoover Institute senior fellow
- Alan Wong, BA (Political Science), 2010, Member of the San Francisco Board of Supervisors

=== Literature ===
- Debito Arudou, MPIA (International Affairs), 1990, author and activist
- Greg Benford, Ph.D. (Astrophysics), 1967, Nebula Award winner
- David Brin, MS (Applied Physics), 1978; Ph.D. (Space Science), 1981, Nebula and Hugo Award Winner; science fiction author, notably of Uplift; physicist
- Robert Todd Carroll, Ph.D. (Philosophy), 1974, publisher of The Skeptic's Dictionary and fellow for Committee for Skeptical Inquiry
- Susann Cokal, BA (French Literature), 1986, author, Michael L. Printz Award Honor winner
- Angela Davis, MA (Philosophy), 1968, radical activist and philosopher
- Suzette Haden Elgin, PhD (Linguistics), 1973, science fiction author
- Raymond E. Feist, BA (Communications), 1977, author
- Nancy Holder, BA (Communications), 1976, Bram Stoker Award winner
- Khaled Hosseini, MD (Medicine), 1993, Afghan-American novelist and physician; his 2003 debut novel, The Kite Runner, was a #1 New York Times bestseller
- Aaron Krach, BA (Visual Arts), 1994, writer
- Virgil Nemoianu, Ph.D. (Literature), 1971, essayist, literary critic, philosopher of culture
- Rex Pickett, BA (Literature and Visual Arts), 1976, author of Sideways
- Kim Stanley Robinson, BA (Literature), 1974; Ph.D. (Literature), 1982, two-time Nebula and Hugo Award winner
- Alan Russell, BA (English and American Literature), 1978, Lefty Award winner and bestselling crime fiction author
- Lotus Vingadassamy-Engel, Ph.D., poet, lyricist, and professor of French literature of the 18th century
- Vernor Vinge, Ph.D. (Mathematics), 1971, Hugo Award-winning science fiction author, computer scientist, and mathematician
- Andy Weir (did not graduate), Astounding Award for Best New Writer-winning science fiction author and computer programmer best known for The Martian and Artemis
- Kirby Wright, BA (English and American Literature), 1983, poet and writer

=== Music and entertainment ===
- Mark Applebaum, Ph.D. (Composition), 1996, composer, former professor of music at Stanford University
- Milo Aukerman, Ph.D. (Biology), 1992, lead singer of punk rock band Descendents
- Em Beihold, BA (Communication), 2020, singer and songwriter
- Walter Aaron Clark, MA, musicologist
- Chaya Czernowin, Ph.D. (Composition), 1993, composer, Walter Bigelow Rosen Professor of Music at Harvard University
- Steven Dehler, BA (Economics), 2010, model, actor, and dancer
- Paul Dresher, MA (Composition), 1976, composer, guitarist, and improviser
- Nathan East, BA (Music), 1978, bass guitarist
- David Felder, Ph.D. (Composition), 1983, composer, SUNY Distinguished Professor at the University at Buffalo
- Jon Foreman, did not graduate, guitarist of rock band Switchfoot
- Tim Foreman, did not graduate, bassist of rock band Switchfoot
- Ben Gleib, BA (Communications and Theatre), 2000, actor and comedian
- Maria Ho, BA (Communications), 2005, professional poker player
- David Evan Jones, Ph.D. (Composition), composer, professor of Music, and Porter College Provost at UC Santa Cruz
- Kelly Kim, BA (Economics), 1998, professional poker player
- Anthony Neely, BS (Psychology and Theatre), 2008, mandopop singer
- Paul Phillips, BS (Computer Science), 1996, professional poker player
- Nicky Youre, BA (International Business), 2021, singer and songwriter

=== Public service ===
- George R. Blumenthal, Ph.D. (Physics), 1972, chancellor of the University of California, Santa Cruz
- Kurt M. Campbell, BA (Special Project Major), 1980, United States deputy secretary of state
- Dana Shell Smith, BA (Political Science), 1992, United States Ambassador to Qatar, 2014–2017

=== Science, technology, medicine, and mathematics ===
- Margaret Allen, MD (Medicine), 1974, first female heart transplant surgeon
- James Benford, 1966 MS, 1969 Ph.D
- Bruce Beutler, BS (Biology), 1976, Nobel Prize in Physiology or Medicine
- Angela N. Brooks, BS (Biology), 2018, University of California, Santa Cruz Women in Science and Engineering Award
- Chu Ching-wu, Ph.D. (Physics), 1990, U.S. News & World Report's Researcher of the Year
- Brian Druker, BS (Chemistry), 1977; MD (Medicine), 1981, oncologist/chief investigator, developed a new drug for leukemia treatment
- Zachary Fisk, PhD (physics), condensed matter physicist
- David Goeddel, BS (Chemistry), 1972, first full-time scientist and director of Genentech's molecular biology department; co-founder, president and CEO of Tularik, Inc.
- William Heidbrink, BA (physics), plasma physicist
- Gerald Joyce, Ph.D. (Biology), 1984, scientist, Salk Institute; inventor of the in vitro evolution technology; director of the Genomics Institute of the Novartis Research Foundation
- Peretz Lavie (born 1949), Israeli expert in the psychophysiology of sleep and sleep disorders, 16th president of the Technion – Israel Institute of Technology, dean of the Rappaport Faculty of Medicine
- Antony Garrett Lisi, Ph.D. (Physics), 1999, theoretical physicist awarded FQXi grant
- Joellen Louise, Ph.D. (Oceanography), 1999, professor in the Department of Geosciences at the University of Arizona and amici in Massachusetts v. EPA, which established the EPA's authority to regulate greenhouse gases
- Philip S. Low, Ph.D. (Computational Neuroscience), 2007, Canadian inventor, computational neuroscientist, and mathematician
- Philip S. Low, Ph.D. (Biochemistry), 1975, professor of Chemistry and researcher whose work has supported numerous drug discoveries
- M. Brian Maple, Ph.D. (Physics), 1969, David Adler Lectureship Award in the Field of Materials Physics
- Eleanor Mariano, BS (Biology), 1977, former director, White House Medical Unit; first Filipino American to reach the rank of rear admiral in the U.S. Navy
- Naomi Miyake, Ph.D. (Psychology), 1982, cognitive psychologist recognized for her contributions to the science of learning
- Walter Munk, Ph.D. (Oceanography), 1947, oceanographer
- Bruce Ovbiagele, MAS (Leadership of Healthcare Organizations), 2012, physician, academician, editor, and hospital leader
- George Perry, Ph.D. (Marine Biology), 1979, researcher in Alzheimer's disease
- Michael Petach (Mechanical Engineering), notable work revolved around developing cryocoolers and the traveling-wave thermoacoustic electric generator, a technology that enhances the efficiency of power generation for spacecraft
- LaVerne E. Ragster, Ph.D. (Biology), 1980, marine biologist; 4th president of the University of the Virgin Islands
- Fred Ramsdell, BS (Biochemistry and Cell Biology), 1983, Nobel Prize in Physiology or Medicine
- Rae Robertson-Anderson, Ph.D. (Biophysics), associate professor at University of San Diego
- Jed E. Rose, Ph.D. (Neurosciences), 1978, professor in Psychiatry and Behavioral Sciences, Duke University, co-inventor of the nicotine patch, president and CEO of the Rose Research Center
- Kathleen (Kate) Rubins, B.S. (Molecular Biology), 1999, NASA astronaut, first person to sequence DNA in space
- Joellen Louise Russell (born 1970), oceanographer and climate scientist
- Maurizio Seracini, BS (Bioengineering), 1973, founded the Editech srl, Diagnostic Center for Cultural Heritage in Florence
- Liz Specht, Ph.D. (Biological sciences), research scientist specializing in chemical engineering and synthetic biology
- Edward Tobinick, MD (Medicine), 1974, patented a use of subcutaneous TNF-α to treat intractable back pain
- Susumu Tonegawa, Ph.D. (Molecular Biology), 1968, Nobel Prize recipient for physiology or medicine for his work on antibody diversity
- Craig Venter, BA (Biochemistry), 1972; PhD (Pharmacology), 1975, president of Celera Genomics, the first private firm to decode the human genome
- Steven E. Wilson, BA (Biology), 1974; MS (Molecular Biology and Biochemistry), 1977; MD (Medicine), 1984, director of corneal research, staff cornea and refractive surgeon, Cleveland Clinic; inventor of topical losartan treatment for corneal scarring/fibrosis

== Distinguished faculty ==
- Hannes Alfven, Electrical Engineering, "father of modern magnetohydrodynamics", eponym of Alfven waves, Nobel Prize in Physics, 1970
- David Antin, Visual Arts, poet and performance artist
- Eleanor Antin, Visual Arts, feminist artist of The Angel of Mercy
- Percival Bazeley, Medicine, member of the Salk Polio vaccine team
- Kenneth Bowles, Computer Science, known for work in initiating and directing the UCSD Pascal project
- Benjamin H. Bratton, Visual Arts, sociologist, architectural and design theorist
- Sydney Brenner, Salk Institute, Nobel Prize in Physiology or Medicine, 2002
- Sheldon Brown, Visual Arts, director of Experimental Game Lab, co-director of Center for Research in Computing and the Arts
- Keith Brueckner, Physics, theoretical physicist, National Academy of Sciences (Physics) member, and a founder of the UCSD Department of Physics
- Geoffrey R. Burbidge, Physics, professor known mostly for his alternative cosmology theory, which contradicts the Big Bang theory
- Margaret Burbidge, Astronomy, first to study and identify quasars; Carnegie Fellowship winner, 1947
- Craig Callender, Science Studies, philosopher of science
- Micha Cárdenas, Visual Arts and Critical Gender Studies, artist and theorist, collective member of Lui Velazquez
- Lin Chao, Biology, known for his early work on the evolution of bacteriocins, his demonstration of Muller's ratchet in the RNA Virus Phi-6
- Jiun-Shyan Chen, engineering professor
- Shu Chien, Bioengineering, bioengineering pioneer and National Medal of Science laureate
- Lakshmi Chilukuri, distinguished microbiologist, provost of Sixth College
- Eric Christmas, Theatre, prolific film actor
- Patricia Churchland, Philosophy, neurophilosopher and MacArthur Fellowship recipient, 1991
- Paul Churchland, Philosophy, philosopher of mind and philosopher of science, proponent eliminative materialism
- Harold Cohen, Visual Arts, English-born artist, creator of AARON
- Francis Crick, Salk Institute, Nobel Prize in Physiology or Medicine, 1962
- Paul Crutzen, Chemistry, atmospheric chemist, Nobel Prize in Chemistry, 1995
- Charles Curtis, Music, avant-garde cellist
- Chaya Czernowin, Music, Israeli composer, former professor of composition
- Anthony Davis, Music, opera composer, jazz pianist
- Diana Deutsch, Psychology, known for research on the psychology of music including the octave illusion
- Bram Dijkstra, English, known for books on the femme fatale icon in popular culture
- Russell Doolittle, Chemistry, known for research on molecular evolution
- Mark Dresser, Music, double bass player and improviser, winner of the Fulbright Fellowship, 1983
- Renato Dulbecco, Salk Institute, helped launch the Human Genome Project, Nobel Prize in Physiology or Medicine, 1975
- Jeffrey Elman, Cognitive Science, psycholinguist and pioneer in the field of neural networks
- Robert F. Engle, Economics, Nobel Memorial Prize in Economic Sciences, 2003
- Robert Erickson, Music, composer; his composition "Sierra" is the state anthem of California
- Ronald M. Evans, Salk Institute, discovered steroid and nuclear receptors; Lasker Award winner
- Manny Farber, Visual Arts, film critic and painter
- Gilles Fauconnier, Cognitive Science, inventor of the modern-day theory of conceptual blending
- George Feher, Physics, Wolf Prize in Chemistry (2006/7), National Academy of Sciences member, biophysicist
- Brian Ferneyhough, Music, composer, founder of New Complexity movement
- David Noel Freedman, Religion, general editor of the Anchor Bible Series
- Y.C. Fung, Bioengineering, "father of bioengineering"
- Fred Gage, Salk Institute, neuroscientist and stem cell biologist; discovered human adult neural stem cells
- Clark Gibson, Political Science, expert on African politics and electoral fraud
- Maria Goeppert-Mayer, Physics, Nobel Prize in Physics, 1963
- Joseph Goguen, Computer Science, helped originate the OBJ family of programming languages
- Adele Goldberg, Linguistics
- Marvin Leonard Goldberger, Physics, National Academy of Sciences (Physics) member, former dean of Natural Sciences, and former president of Caltech
- Lawrence S.B. Goldstein, Cellular and Molecular Medicine, first to characterize kinesin molecular motors; head of UCSD stem cell research program
- Jean-Pierre Gorin, Visual Arts, film director, best known for his work with the French New Wave
- Fan Chung Graham, Mathematics, mathematician, Akamai Professor in Internet Mathematics working in the area of spectral graph theory, extremal graph theory and random graphs
- Ronald Graham, Computer Science and Engineering, mathematician, one of the principal architects of the rapid development worldwide of discrete mathematics
- Clive W.J. Granger, Economics, Nobel Memorial Prize in Economic Sciences, 2003
- Deborah Hertz, History, author of Jewish High Society in Old Regime Berlin, Herman Wouk Chair in Modern Jewish Studies
- Gretchen Hofmann, Ecology, ecologist whose work on the effects of changing seawater acidity and temperature on marine life has drawn wide attention
- Edwin Hutchins, Cognitive Science, developed distributed cognition and cognitive ethnography; MacArthur Grant, 1985
- Harvey Itano, Pathology, biochemist known for his work on the molecular basis of sickle cell anemia and other diseases
- Gabriel Jackson, History, Fulbright scholar, historian, author, and former department chairman
- Irwin M. Jacobs, Electrical and Computer Engineering, chairman of Qualcomm
- Fredric Jameson, Comparative Literature, literary critic and Marxist political theorist
- Henrik Wann Jensen, Computer Science, developed first technique for efficiently simulating subsurface scattering in translucent materials; winner of an Academy Award for Technical Achievement in 2004 from the Academy of Motion Picture and Sciences
- Chalmers Johnson, History, author; president and co-founder of the Japan Policy Research Institute
- David K Jordan, Anthropology, provost of Warren College, Alumni Association Distinguished Teaching Award 2008 recipient
- Madlyn M. Kahr (1913–2004; B.A. 1933), art historian, professor emeritus at UCSD
- Allan Kaprow, Visual Arts, painter, assemblagist and pioneer in establishing the concepts of performance art
- Harvey Karten, Neuroscience, National Academy of Sciences member, neuroscientist
- Charles David Keeling, Oceanography, first alerted the world to the anthropogenic contribution to the "greenhouse effect" and global warming; discoverer of the Keeling Curve
- Walter Kohn, Physics, Nobel Prize in Chemistry, 1998, notable for the Kohn-Sham equations
- Barbara Kruger, Visual Arts, conceptual artist and collagist
- Ronald Langacker, Linguistics, creator of cognitive grammar
- William Lerach, guest lecturer, taught securities and corporate law; a leading securities lawyer in the US; his life was the subject of Circle of Greed: The Spectacular Rise and Fall of the Lawyer Who Brought Corporate America to its Knees
- George E. Lewis, Music, jazz trombone player, MacArthur Fellowship winner, 2002
- Lei Liang, Music, composer, winner of the Grawemeyer Award, Rome Prize, Pulitzer Prize finalist, and recipient of the Guggenheim Fellowship
- Arend Lijphart, Political Science, elected to the American Academy of Arts and Sciences in 1989; president of the American Political Science Association 1995–1996; recipient of the Johan Skytte Prize in Political Science, 1997
- Yu-Hwa Lo, Electrical and Computer Engineering
- George Mandler, Psychology, experimental psychologist, founder of UCSD Department of Psychology
- Jean Matter Mandler, Psychology, specialist in cognitive development, winner of the Eleanor Maccoby Outstanding Book Award from the APA
- Babette Mangolte, Visual Arts, French cinematographer
- Lev Manovich, Visual Arts, New Media theorist, director of Software Studies Initiative
- M. Brian Maple, Physics, National Academy of Sciences member, physicist
- Herbert Marcuse, Philosophy, mentor to Angela Davis, author of Eros and Civilization and One-Dimensional Man
- Harry Markowitz, Finance, Nobel Memorial Prize in Economic Sciences, 1990
- Andrew Mattison, Psychiatry, co-author of The Male Couple, co-founder of the University of California Center for Medicinal Cannabis Research
- Mathew D. McCubbins, Political Science, Fellow of the American Academy of Arts and Sciences
- William McGinnis, Molecular Biology, former dean of the School of Biological Sciences, Member of the National Academy of Sciences USA
- Elliot McVeigh, Bioengineering, Medicine, and Radiology, director of Cardiovascular Imaging Lab, Researcher at Cardiovascular Imaging Lab and Faculty
- Mario Molina, Chemistry, Nobel Prize in Chemistry, 1995
- Eileen Myles, Literature, poet, Guggenheim Fellowship winner, and author of Afterglow
- Donald Norman, Cognitive Science and Psychology, co-founder and first chair of Cognitive Science; author of User Centered System Design; VP of Apple; National Academy of Engineering
- Pauline Oliveros, Music, composer, central figure in the development of post-war electronic art music
- George Emil Palade, Medicine, Nobel Prize in Physiology and Medicine, 1974 and winner of the National Medal of Science
- Linus Pauling, Chemistry, Nobel Prize in Chemistry, 1954
- Albert P. Pisano, National Academy of Engineering member, dean of the Jacobs School of Engineering, specialist in microelectromechanical systems
- Richard Popkin, Philosophy, onternationally acclaimed scholar on Jewish and Christian millenarianism and messianism
- Samuel Popkin, Political Science, pollster who played a role in the development of rational choice theory
- Miller Puckette, Music, creator of Puredata Programming Language and co-director of Center for Research in Computing and the Arts
- Vilayanur S. Ramachandran, Neuroscience and Psychology, author of several books including Phantoms in the Brain
- Claire L. Ramsey, associate professor emerita and author
- Jef Raskin, Computer Science, founder of the Apple Macintosh project
- Roger Revelle (1909–1991), Oceanography, scholar, namesake of Roger Revelle College, and former president of the American Association for the Advancement of Science
- Roger Reynolds, Music, Pulitzer Prize for Music, 1989
- Sally Ride, Physics, former astronaut, first American woman in space
- Marshall Rosenbluth Physics, developer of the Metropolis algorithm, member of the National Academy of Sciences, called the "pope of plasma physics"
- Rosaura Sánchez, Literature, author and literary critic
- Herbert Schiller, Communication, media critic, sociologist, and scholar
- Terry Sejnowski, Biological Sciences, winner of the Wright Prize and fellow of the Institute of Electrical and Electronics Engineers
- Kartik Seshadri, Music, sitar player, director of the Indian Classical Music Ensemble
- Lu Jeu Sham, Physics, National Academy of Sciences member, Kohn-Sham equations, Guggenheim Fellowship, 1983
- Ravi Shankar, Music, sitar player, collaborated with violinist Yehudi Menuhin and George Harrison
- Susan Shirk, International Relations and Pacific Studies, former deputy assistant secretary of state during the Clinton administration
- Nicholas Spitzer, Biology, founding editor of BrainFacts.org, fellow of the American Association for the Advancement of Science, and National Academy of Sciences member
- Larry Squire, Psychiatry, Neurosciences, and Psychology, leading investigator of the neurological bases of memory
- John G. Stoessinger, Political Science, author, recipient of the Bancroft Prize for The Might of Nations
- Avrum Stroll, Philosophy, scholar in the fields of epistemology and the philosophy of language; author of over a dozen books
- Suresh Subramani, Biological Sciences, Guggenheim Fellowship recipient and former Executive Vice Chancellor of Academic Affairs
- Harry Suhl, Physics, National Academy of Sciences (Physics) member; Guggenheim Fellowship, 1968
- Leó Szilárd, Salk Institute, physicist who contributed to the Manhattan Project; founded the Council for a Livable World
- JoAnn Trejo, professor of pharmacology, National Academy of Medicine member
- Roger Tsien, Chemistry, Nobel Prize in Chemistry, 2008; Wolf Prize in Medicine, 2004; known for discovering green fluorescent protein
- Chinary Ung, Music, Grawemeyer Award-winning composer
- Harold Urey, Chemistry, Nobel Prize in Chemistry, 1934
- Benjamin Elazari Volcani, Scripps Institute, microbiologist; discovered life in the Dead Sea; pioneered biological silicon research
- Joseph Wang, Nanoengineering, ISI's world's most cited engineer, ISI's world's most cited chemist
- Les Waters, Theatre, former artistic director of the Actors Theatre of Louisville
- Kenneth Watson, Physics, National Academy of Sciences (Physics) member
- K. Wayne Yang, Ethnic Studies, with Eve Tuck, author of "Decolonization is not a metaphor"
- Herbert F. York, Physics, university chancellor; Enrico Fermi Award, 2000
- Efim Zelmanov, Mathematics, Fields Medal recipient, known for his work on combinatorial problems in nonassociative algebra and group theory
- Bruno H. Zimm, Chemistry and Biochemistry, National Academy of Sciences member, biophysicist, and leading polymer chemist
