= Steve Wilson =

Steve or Steven Wilson may refer to:

== Music ==
- Steve Wilson (jazz musician) (born 1961), American jazz saxophonist and flautist
- Steve Wilson (drummer), former drummer for Against All Will
- Steve Wilson (born 1967), Scottish guitarist, member of the Scottish rock band Stiltskin
- Steven Wilson (born 1967), English progressive rock musician and member of the band Porcupine Tree
- Steve Wilson (producer), Nashville-based songwriter, musician and producer of More Beautiful You by Jonny Diaz, 2009

== Politics ==
- Steve Wilson (Ohio politician), Ohio state senator
- Steven Wilson, candidate in the United States House of Representatives elections in Missouri, 2010

== Sports ==
- Stephen Wilson (athlete) (born 1971), an Australian paralympic athlete
- Steve Wilson (offensive lineman) (born 1954), U.S. NFL player for the Tampa Bay Buccaneers
- Steve Wilson (defensive back) (born 1957), U.S. NFL player for the Denver Broncos
- Steve Wilson (baseball) (born 1964), Canadian baseball player
- Steven Wilson (baseball) (born 1994), US baseball player
- Steve Wilson (football commentator) (born 1967), British Match of the Day commentator
- Steve Wilson (footballer) (born 1974), English goalkeeper

== Other ==
- Steve Wilson (director), U.S. television director
- Steven Wilson (gamer), U.S. esports driver
- Steve Wilson (presenter) (born 1974), English television presenter
- Steve Wilson (reporter), U.S. investigative reporter
- Steve Wilson, character in Angels with Broken Wings
- S. S. Wilson (Steven Seth Wilson), U.S. screenwriter
- Steven E. Wilson, U.S. professor of ophthalmology

== See also ==
- Stephen Clarke-Willson, video game and software expert
- Stephen Wilson (disambiguation)
