= List of members of the National Academy of Sciences (applied physical sciences) =

This list is a subsection of the List of members of the National Academy of Sciences, which includes members and international members of the United States National Academy of Sciences, living and deceased, each affiliated with one of the academy's disciplinary sections. Members are listed under their primary section, and each entry gives the person's name, primary institution, and election year. For deceased members, the year of death is noted.

Name	Institution	Year
Alexei Alexeyevich Abrikosov (died 2017)	Argonne National Laboratory	2000
Gabriel Aeppli	ETH Zurich	2015
Pierre Aigrain (died 2002)	No Affiliation	1974
Reka Albert	The Pennsylvania State University	2025
Boris Altshuler	Columbia University	2002
David E. Aspnes	North Carolina State University	1998
Allen V. Astin (died 1984)	National Bureau of Standards	1960
Phaedon Avouris	IBM Thomas J. Watson Research Center	2017
David D. Awschalom	The University of Chicago	2007
James G. Baker (died 2005)	Harvard University	1965
Robert W. Balluffi (died 2022)	Massachusetts Institute of Technology	1982
Albert-László Barabási	Northeastern University	2024
Charles S. Barrett (died 1994)	University of Colorado Boulder	1967
Dmitri Basov	Columbia University	2020
Charles P. Bean (died 1996)	Rensselaer Polytechnic Institute	1976
Malcolm R. Beasley	Stanford University	1993
J. Georg Bednorz	IBM Research	2018
Richard Bellman (died 1984)	University of Southern California	1983
Joseph Berkson (died 1982)	Mayo Clinic	1979
Ira Bernstein (died 2024)	Yale University	1984
Gerd K. Binnig	Definiens	1987
Robert J. Birgeneau	University of California, Berkeley	2004
Immanuel Bloch	LMU Munich	2025
Hendrik Wade Bode (died 1982)	AT&T Bell Laboratories	1957
Gregory S. Boebinger	Florida State University	2021
Raj Chandra Bose (died 1987)	Colorado State University	1976
William F. Brinkman	No Affiliation	1984
Harvey Brooks (died 2004)	Harvard University	1962
Elias Burstein (died 2017)	University of Pennsylvania	1979
John W. Cahn (died 2016)	National Institute of Standards and Technology	1973
Herbert B. Callen (died 1993)	University of Pennsylvania	1990
Roberto Car	Princeton University	2016
Manuel Cardona (died 2014)	Max Planck Institute for Solid State Research	1987
Kenneth M. Case (died 2006)	Rockefeller University	1975
Hendrik B. G. Casimir (died 2000)	Leiden University	1970
Michael E. Cates	University of Cambridge	2021
Robert J. Cava	Princeton University	2001
Paul M. Chaikin	New York University	2004
Arup K. Chakraborty	Massachusetts Institute of Technology	2016
Bruce Chalmers (died 1990)	Harvard University	1975
David Chandler (died 2017)	University of California, Berkeley	1995
Leroy L. Chang (died 2008)	Hong Kong University of Science and Technology	1994
Praveen Chaudhari (died 2010)	Brookhaven National Laboratory	2003
Daniel S. Chemla (died 2008)	Lawrence Berkeley National Laboratory	1997
John Chipman (died 1983)	Massachusetts Institute of Technology	1955
C. W. Chu	University of Houston	1989
Ignacio Cirac	Max Planck Institute of Quantum Optics	2024
Noel A. Clark	University of Colorado Boulder	2007
Albert M. Clogston (died 2013)	AT&T Corporation	1973
J. Michael D. Coey	Trinity College Dublin	2005
Morrel H. Cohen	Rutgers, The State University of New Jersey	1978
Morris Cohen (died 2005)	Massachusetts Institute of Technology	1968
Susan N. Coppersmith	University of New South Wales	2009
Paul B. Corkum	University of Ottawa	2009
Allan M. Cormack (died 1998)	Tufts University	1983
George W. Crabtree (died 2023)	University of Illinois at Chicago	2008
Michael F. Crommie	University of California, Berkeley	2025
Herman Z. Cummins (died 2010)	City College of the City University of New York	1996
Lawrence Darken (died 1978)	Pennsylvania State University	1961
Luiz Davidovich	Federal University of Rio de Janeiro	2006
John M. Dawson (died 2001)	University of California, Los Angeles	1977
Francisco de la Cruz	Centro Atomico Bariloche	2002
Francis J. DiSalvo (died 2023)	Cornell University	1991
David P. DiVincenzo	Julich Research Center	2023
Richard J. Duffin (died 1996)	Carnegie Mellon University	1972
Pol Duwez (died 1984)	California Institute of Technology	1972
Robert C. Dynes (died 2025)	University of California System	1989
Dean E. Eastman (died 2018)	University of Chicago	1982
Sam Edwards (died 2015)	University of Cambridge	1996
Gert Ehrlich (died 2012)	University of Illinois at Urbana–Champaign	1986
Donald M. Eigler	The Wetnose Institute for Advanced Pelagic Studies	2012
James P. Eisenstein	California Institute of Technology	2005
Leopoldo M. Falicov (died 1995)	University of California, Berkeley	1983
Mitchell J. Feigenbaum (died 2019)	Rockefeller University	1988
Claudia Anna-Maria Felser	Max Planck Institute for Chemical Physics of Solids	2021
Matthew P.A. Fisher	University of California, Santa Barbara	2012
Zachary Fisk	University of California, Irvine	1996
Paul A. Fleury	Yale University	1999
Eduardo H. Fradkin	University of Illinois at Urbana–Champaign	2013
Alan Fowler (died 2024)	International Business Machines Corporation	1990
Charles Frank (died 1998)	University of Bristol	1987
Daniel Frenkel	University of Cambridge	2016
Jacques Friedel (died 2014)	Académie des Sciences de l'Institut de France	1992
Giulia Galli	The University of Chicago	2020
T. H. Geballe (died 2021)	Stanford University	1973
Andre Geim	University of Manchester	2012
Ivar Giaever (died 2025)	Rensselaer Polytechnic Institute	1974
Steven M. Girvin	Yale University	2006
Leonid Glazman	Yale University	2025
Sharon C. Glotzer	University of Michigan	2014
Nigel D. Goldenfeld	University of California, San Diego	2010
Allen M. Goldman (died 2025)	University of Minnesota	2007
Jerry P. Gollub (died 2019)	Haverford College	1993
John B. Goodenough (died 2023)	The University of Texas at Austin	2012
Arthur C. Gossard (died 2022)	University of California, Santa Barbara	2001
Harold Grad (died 1986)	New York University	1970
Laura Greene	Florida State University	1994
Francisco Guinea	IMDEA Nanoscience Institute	2017
Homer Hagstrum (died 1994)	AT&T Bell Laboratories	1976
Naomi J. Halas	Rice University	2013
Robert Hall (died 2016)	General Electric Company	1978
Arthur F. Hebard	University of Florida	2017
Alan J. Heeger	University of California, Santa Barbara	2001
Tony F. Heinz	Stanford University	2024
Robert W. Hellwarth (died 2021)	University of Southern California	1986
Theodore Holstein (died 1985)	University of California, Los Angeles	1981
John Kenneth Hulm (died 2004)	Westinghouse Electric Corporation	1988
David A. Huse	Princeton University	2017
Harold Y. Hwang	Stanford University	2024
Jisoon Ihm	Pohang University of Science and Technology	2011
Yoseph Imry (died 2018)	Weizmann Institute of Science	2008
Jainendra K. Jain	The Pennsylvania State University	2021
Pablo Jarillo-Herrero	Massachusetts Institute of Technology	2022
Christopher Jarzynski	University of Maryland, College Park	2020
John D. Joannopoulos (died 2025)	Massachusetts Institute of Technology	2009
Res Jost (died 1990)	ETH Zurich	1976
Charles L. Kane	University of Pennsylvania	2014
Arthur Kantrowitz (died 2008)	Dartmouth College	1966
Mehran Kardar	Massachusetts Institute of Technology	2018
Marc A. Kastner	Massachusetts Institute of Technology	2008
Leonid V. Keldysh (died 2016)	Russian Academy of Sciences	1995
Jack C. Kiefer (died 1981)	Cornell University	1975
Philip Kim	Harvard University	2023
Miles V. Klein (died 2022)	University of Illinois at Urbana–Champaign	1998
Gabriel Kotliar	Rutgers, The State University of New Jersey, New Brunswick	2019
Leo P. Kouwenhoven	Delft University of Technology	2014
Robert H. Kraichnan (died 2008)	No Affiliation	2000
Herbert Kroemer (died 2024)	University of California, Santa Barbara	2003
Rolf W. Landauer (died 1999)	IBM Thomas J. Watson Research Center	1988
James S. Langer	University of California, Santa Barbara	1985
Melvin Lax (died 2002)	City University of New York	1983
Joel L. Lebowitz	Rutgers, The State University of New Jersey, New Brunswick	1980
Patrick Lee	Massachusetts Institute of Technology	1991
Peter B. Littlewood	The University of Chicago	2025
Andrea J. Liu	University of Pennsylvania	2016
Steven G. Louie	University of California, Berkeley	2005
Olli V. Lounasmaa (died 2002)	Helsinki University of Technology	1998
Tom C. Lubensky	University of Pennsylvania	2002
Mikhail D. Lukin	Harvard University	2018
Allan H. MacDonald	The University of Texas at Austin	2010
J. Ross Macdonald (died 2024)	University of North Carolina at Chapel Hill	1973
Gerald D. Mahan (died 2021)	Pennsylvania State University	1995
Theodore H. Maiman (died 2007)	Independent Consultant	1980
Benoit Mandelbrot (died 2010)	Yale University	1987
M. Brian Maple	University of California, San Diego	2004
M. Cristina Marchetti	University of California, Santa Barbara	2019
Paul L. McEuen	Cornell University	2011
William L. McMillan (died 1984)	University of Illinois Urbana-Champaign	1982
Eugene J. Mele	University of Pennsylvania	2019
Andrew J. Millis	Columbia University	2020
Raymond D. Mindlin (died 1987)	Columbia University	1973
Marvin L. Minsky (died 2016)	Massachusetts Institute of Technology	1973
Kathryn Moler	Stanford University	2021
Valeria Molinero	University of Utah	2022
Joel Moore	University of California, Berkeley	2022
Erwin Wilhelm Mueller (died 1977)	The Pennsylvania State University	1975
K. Alex Müller (died 2023)	University of Zurich	1989
William W. Mullins (died 2001)	Carnegie Mellon University	1984
Cherry A. Murray	Harvard University	1999
Naoto Nagaosa	RIKEN	2020
Sidney R. Nagel	University of Chicago	2003
David R. Nelson	Harvard University	1994
Risto M. Nieminen	Aalto University	2018
Konstantin Novoselov	National University of Singapore	2019
Philippe Nozières (died 2022)	Institut Laue-Langevin	1991
Joseph W. Orenstein	University of California, Berkeley	2022
Edward Ott	University of Maryland, College Park	2022
Giorgio Parisi	University of Rome	2003
Michele Parrinello	ETH Zurich	2010
John B. Pendry	Imperial College London	2013
William G. Penney (died 1991)	University of Oxford	1962
William G. Pfann (died 1982)	AT&T Bell Laboratories	1974
Loren N. Pfeiffer	Princeton University	2011
J. C. Phillips	Rutgers, The State University of New Jersey, New Brunswick	1977
E. Ward Plummer (died 2020)	Louisiana State University	2006
Robert O. Pohl (died 2024)	Cornell University	1999
William Prager (died 1980)	Brown University	1968
Karin M. Rabe	Rutgers, The State University of New Jersey, New Brunswick	2013
Sriram R. Ramaswamy	Indian Institute of Science	2025
Ana Maria Rey Ayala	University of Colorado Boulder	2023
T. Maurice Rice (died 2024)	Swiss Federal Institute of Technology	1993
M. N. Rosenbluth (died 2003)	University of California, San Diego	1969
John Rowell	No Affiliation	1994
Angel Rubio	Max Planck Institute for the Structure & Dynamics of Matter	2014
Isadore Rudnick (died 1997)	University of California, Los Angeles	1983
Myriam P. Sarachik (died 2021)	City College of the City University of New York	1994
Robert J. Schoelkopf	Yale University	2015
Lu Jeu Sham	University of California, San Diego	1998
Y. Ron Shen	University of California, Berkeley	1995
Zhi-Xun Shen	Stanford University	2015
Gen Shirane (died 2005)	Brookhaven National Laboratory	1989
Boris Shklovskii	University of Minnesota	2023
Cyril Stanley Smith (died 1992)	Massachusetts Institute of Technology	1957
Nicola Spaldin	ETH Zurich	2025
H. Eugene Stanley	Boston University	2004
Richard S. Stein (died 2021)	University of Massachusetts Amherst	1990
Eli Sternberg (died 1988)	California Institute of Technology	1979
Frank H. Stillinger	Princeton University	1984
James J. Stoker (died 1992)	New York University	1963
Horst L. Störmer	Columbia University	1999
Steven Strogatz	Cornell University	2024
Harry L. Swinney	University of Texas at Austin	1992
Jan Tauc (died 2010)	Brown University	1992
Gareth Thomas (died 2014)	University of California, Berkeley	1983
David J. Thouless (died 2019)	University of Washington	1995
Erio Tosatti	International School for Advanced Studies	2011
Daniel C. Tsui	Princeton University	1987
David Turnbull (died 2007)	Harvard University	1968
David Vanderbilt	Rutgers, The State University of New Jersey, New Brunswick	2013
Ashvin Vishwanath	Harvard University	2024
Klaus von Klitzing	Max Planck Institute for Solid State Research	1990
Jelena Vuckovic	Stanford University	2023
George D. Watkins	Lehigh University	1988
Richard A. Webb(died 2016)	University of South Carolina	1996
John D. Weeks	University of Maryland, College Park	2009
Alvin M. Weinberg (died 2006)	Oak Ridge Associated Universities	1961
David A. Weitz	Harvard University	2010
Steven R. White	University of California, Irvine	2018
Ellen D. Williams	University of Maryland, College Park	2005
Maw-Kuen Wu	Academia Sinica (Taiwan)	2004
Ali Yazdani	Princeton University	2019
Anton Zeilinger	Austrian Academy of Sciences	2013
Clarence Zener (died 1993)	Carnegie Mellon University	1959
Jie Zhang	Shanghai Jiao Tong University	2012
