= Heidbrink (surname) =

Heidbrink is a surname of German or Dutch origin. Variants: Heidebrink, Heitbrink. Notable people with the surname include:

- Ingo Heidbrink (born 1968), German maritime historian
- James Russell Heidbrink, birth name of Owl Goingback (born 1959), American novelist
- William Heidbrink, plasma physicist
