= Sung Ryul Eric Yang =

Physics professor

- 양승열
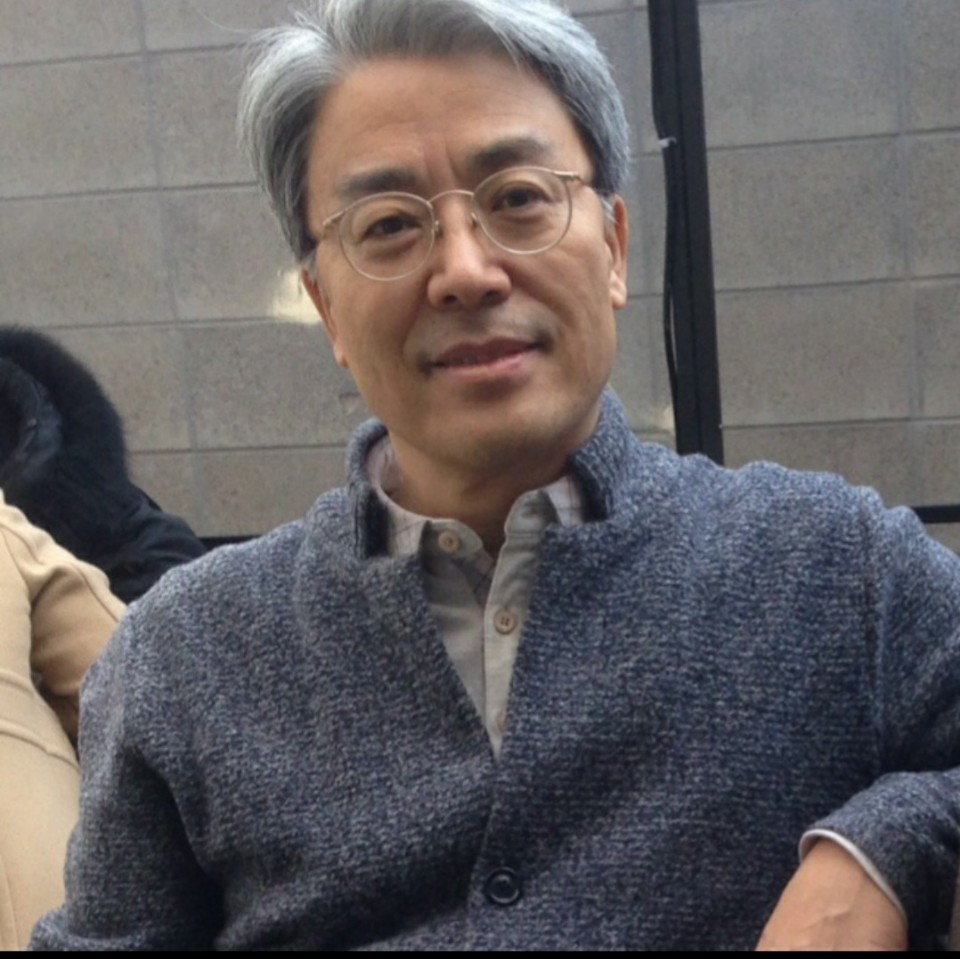
- Education: Copenhagen University, University of California, San Diego
- Known for: Quantum Hall edge reconstruction, integer quantum Hall phase transition, topologically ordered graphene zigzag nanoribbons
- Scientific career
- Fields: Theoretical condensed matter, Strongly correlated systems
- Workplaces: Korea University
- Doctoral advisor: Lu Jeu Sham
- Other academic advisors: Henrik Smith
- Website: https://cond-mat.tistory.com

Sung Ryul Eric Yang (S.-R. Eric Yang) is a theoretical condensed matter physicist. He is a full professor in the Department of Physics of Korea University.

== Education ==
Yang earned his Candidate of Science from the University of Copenhagen in 1982 under supervision of Henrik Smith, who is a co-author of the book Bose–Einstein Condensation in Dilute Gases (Cambridge University Press, 2008). He attended University of California, San Diego, from which he obtained a PhD degree in physics in 1986 under the supervision of Lu Jeu Sham.

== Academic career ==
After receiving his PhD, Yang worked as a postdoctoral researcher at the University of Maryland from 1986 to 1987. He then worked as a research officer at the National Research Council of Canada from 1987 to 1995. In 1995, Yang joined the faculty of the Department of Physics at Korea University as an associate professor and in 2000, he became full professor. He was the condensed matter coordinator at Asia Pacific Center of Theoretical Physics (APCTP) during its establishment period.

His research interests include quantum Hall edge reconstruction, many-body physics and its interplay with disorder. He showed, in collaboration with Allan H. MacDonald, that electron interaction effects do not change the critical properties of the integer quantum Hall plateau transitions, except for the dynamic critical exponent. In recent years, Yang's research focuses on topological order of disordered graphene zigzag nanoribbons. He showed that disordered interacting graphene zigzag nanoribbons is a new topologically ordered insulator with semionic $e/2$ fractional charges.

A recent work demonstrates that disordered and interacting two-leg electron ladders exhibit a finite topological entanglement entropy (TEE). This behavior is attributed to the emergence of two e/2 fractional charges, each localized on one of the two chains. The numerically extracted TEE closely matches that of zigzag graphene nanoribbons, suggesting that both systems lie within the same topological universality class. To support this finding, a semion Lagrangian was constructed that reproduces the expected anyonic statistics. This effective field theory captures the essential topological features observed in the numerics and provides compelling evidence for a nontrivial topological phase in these disordered, quasi-one-dimensional systems. Notably, the associated universality class lies beyond the standard classification based on modular tensor categories, which typically describe intrinsic topological order in strictly two-dimensional settings.

== Textbook ==
In 2023, Yang published a graduate textbook titled Topologically Ordered Zigzag Nanoribbon: e/2 Fractionally Charged Anyons and Spin-Charge Separation (World Scientific). The book has been reviewed by Philip Kim.

== Personal life ==
From the age of 12, Yang has lived in various countries including Vietnam, Mexico, Denmark, the US, and Canada. Denmark is where he spent the majority of his adolescent years. He has a Korean wife and two daughters.
