= Shay Whitcomb =

American baseball player (born 1998)

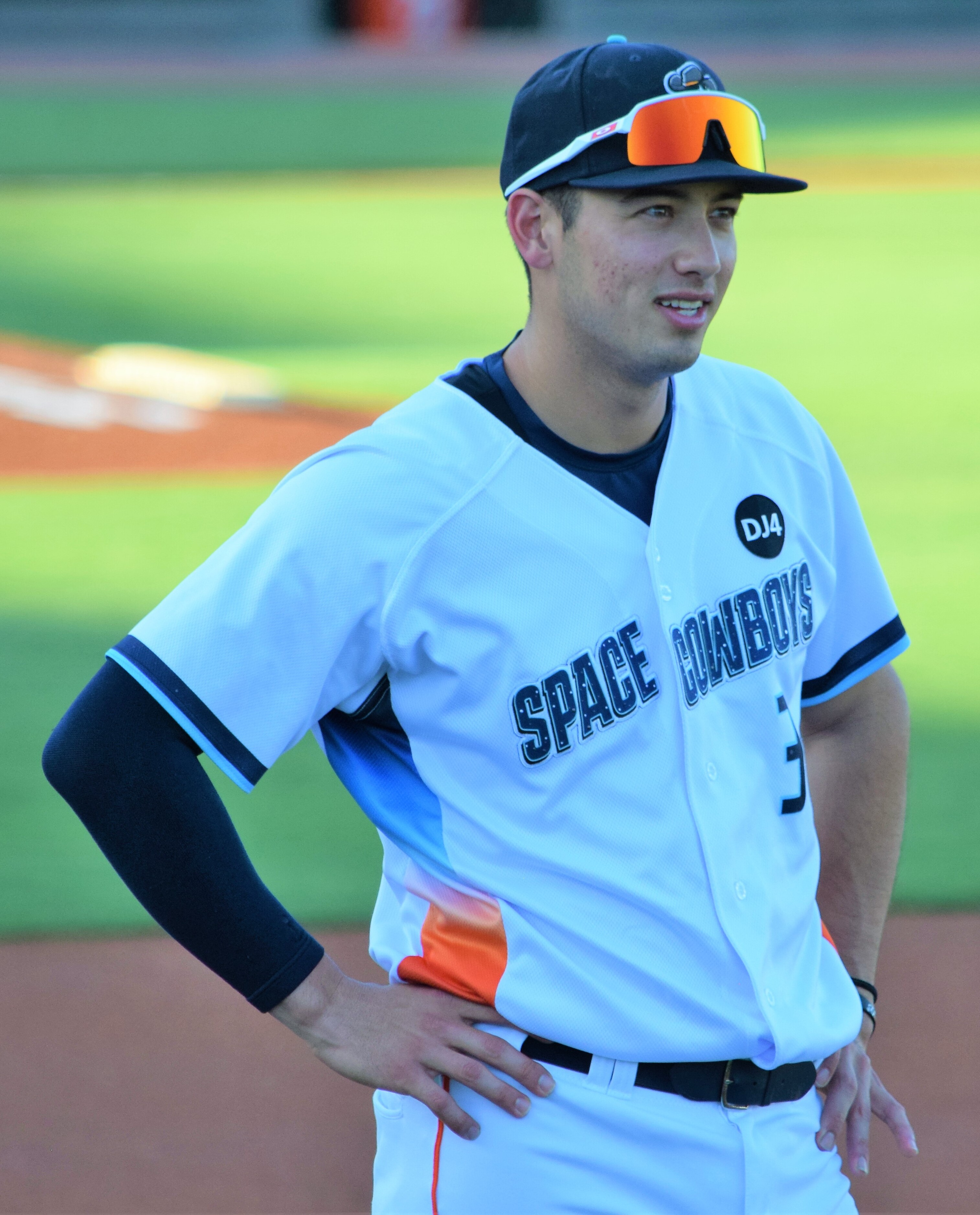
- Whitcomb with the Sugar Land Space Cowboys in 2023

Philadelphia Phillies
- Infielder
- Born: September 28, 1998 (age 28); Thousand Oaks, California, U.S.
- Bats: Right Throws: Right

MLB debut
- August 17, 2024, for the Houston Astros

MLB statistics (through 2026 season)
- Batting average: .196
- Home runs: 5
- Runs batted in: 19
- Stats at Baseball Reference

Teams
- Houston Astros (2024–2026); San Francisco Giants (2026)

Shay Lane Whitcomb (born September 28, 1998) is an American professional baseball infielder for the Philadelphia Phillies of Major League Baseball (MLB). He has previously played in MLB for the Houston Astros and San Francisco Giants.

== Early life ==
Whitcomb was born in Thousand Oaks, California and is a 2017 graduate of Newbury Park High School, where he was All-Marmonte League First Team and All-Ventura County Second Team during his senior year. Shay's mother Yoonie is of Korean descent.

== Amateur career ==
Whitcomb attended Newbury Park High School in Newbury Park, California, and played college baseball at the University of California, San Diego. In 2019, he played collegiate summer baseball with the Orleans Firebirds of the Cape Cod Baseball League.

== Professional career ==
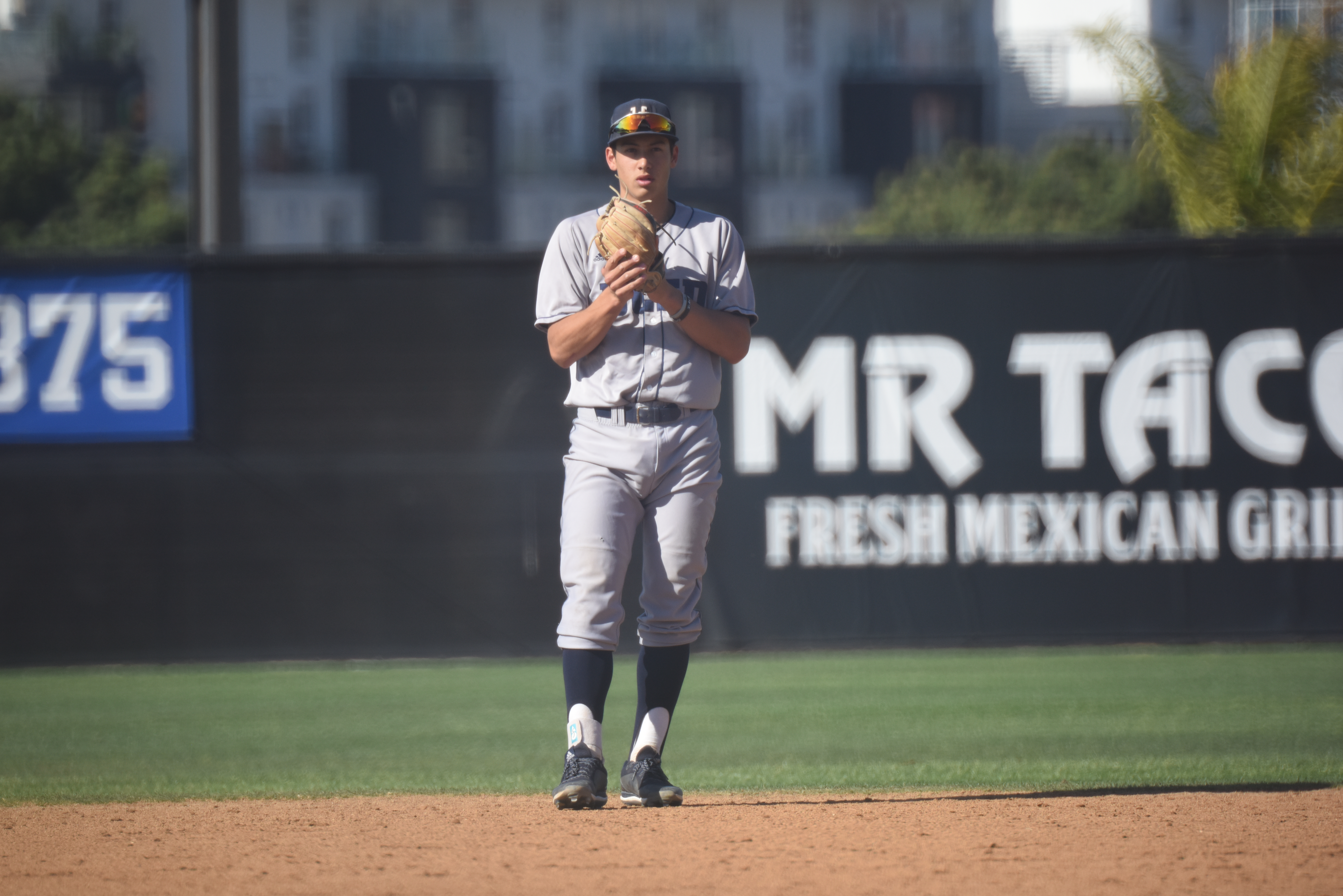
Whitcomb with the UC San Diego Tritons in 2018

=== Houston Astros ===
==== 2020–2023 ====
Whitcomb was drafted by the Houston Astros in the fifth round of the 2020 Major League Baseball draft. He was the final player selected in the draft which was shortened due to the COVID-19 pandemic. Whitcomb did not play in a game in 2020 due to the cancellation of the minor league season as a result of the pandemic.

Whitcomb spent his first professional season in 2021 with the Single–A Fayetteville Woodpeckers and High–A Asheville Tourists. Over 99 games between the two affiliates, he slashed .293/.363/.530 with 23 home runs, 78 RBI, 30 stolen bases, and 25 doubles. Whitcomb spent 2022 with the Double–A Corpus Christi Hooks, playing in 118 games and hitting .219/.283/.399 with 19 home runs, 60 RBI, and 20 stolen bases. Whitcomb split 2023 between Corpus Christi and the Triple–A Sugar Land Space Cowboys. In 133 games split between the two affiliates, he slashed .240/.301/.470 with 20 stolen bases and career–highs in home runs (35) and RBI (102).

==== 2024 ====
Whitcomb began the 2024 campaign with Triple–A Sugar Land, hitting .293/.378/.530 with 25 home runs, 91 RBI, and 26 stolen bases. On August 16, 2024, Whitcomb was selected to the 40-man roster and promoted to the major leagues for the first time. Making his major league debut on August 17, he started at third base in place of an injured Alex Bregman, and doubled in his first major league at bat versus Chris Flexen of the Chicago White Sox. Whitcomb also had one other hit, a walk, and a run scored to help lead a 6–1 win. He hit a two-run single on August 22 versus Corbin Burnes at Oriole Park at Camden Yards for his first career RBI to help lead a 6–0 win. In 20 games for Houston in his rookie campaign, Whitcomb slashed .220/.304/.293 with no home runs and five RBI.

Whitcomb's regular season totals at Sugar Land included batting .293/.378/.530, 25 home runs, 91 RBI, 73 runs scored, 53 walks, 95 strikeouts, and 26 stolen bases over 108 games and 481 plate appearances. With Sugar Land, Whitcomb won the Triple–A Championship over the Omaha Storm Chasers, the first-ever for Sugar Land, and he was named the Championship MVP. Following the 2024 season, Whitcomb was named Houston Astros Minor League Player of the Year, and Triple-A All-Star

==== 2025 ====
Whitcomb was optioned to Triple-A Sugar Land to begin the 2025 season. He hit a walk-off home run on May 14 against the Reno Aces. On May 28 at Isotopes Park, Whitcomb recorded his first three-home run game in professional baseball. Recognized as the Houston Astros' Upper-Level Minor League Player of the Month for both April and May 2025, Whitcomb hit .310/.389/.670 in 25 games in May with 12 home runs, 21 RBI, 24 runs scored, and five stolen bases. He tied for the minor league lead in home runs and was 7th in total bases. On July 2, Whitcomb hit his first career home run off of Austin Gomber of the Colorado Rockies. In 20 total appearances for Houston, he went 4-for-32 (.125) with one home run and one RBI.

==== 2026 ====
Whitcomb was optioned to Triple-A Sugar Land to begin the 2026 season. He appeared in 17 games for Houston, slashing .130/.167/.391 with two home runs and five RBI. Whitcomb was designated for assignment by the Astros on August 10, 2026.

=== San Francisco Giants ===
On August 13, 2026, Whitcomb was claimed off of waivers by the San Francisco Giants. He was recalled up to the team for the first time on August 24. Whitcomb made 32 appearances for San Francisco, slashing .226/.250/.323 with two home runs, eight RBI, and two stolen bases.

=== Philadelphia Phillies ===
On November 2, 2026, Whitcomb was claimed off of waivers by the Philadelphia Phillies.

== International career ==
Whitcomb represents South Korea at the international level. In his World Baseball Classic debut in 2026, he hit two home runs against the Czech Republic, going 2–for–4 with three RBI, culminating in a 11–4 win for South Korea.

== See also ==
- List of University of California, San Diego people
