= Stephen Wilson =

Stephen Wilson may refer to:

- Stephen Fowler Wilson (1821–1897), U.S. Representative from Pennsylvania
- Stephen Victor Wilson (born 1941), U.S. federal judge
- Stephen Wilson (historian) (born 1941), English historian
- Stephen John Wilson (born 1948), former Australian politician from Tasmania
- Stephen Wilson (athlete) (born 1971), Australian track and field athlete
- Stephen Wilson (boxer) (born 1971), British boxer
- Stephen W. Wilson, United States Air Force Lieutenant General
- W. Stephen Wilson (born 1946), mathematician
- Stephen Wilson Jr. (born July 11, 1979), American musician

== See also ==
- Steven Wilson (born 1967), founder of progressive rock band Porcupine Tree
- Steve Wilson (disambiguation)
