= Deborah Hertz =

American historian (born 1949)

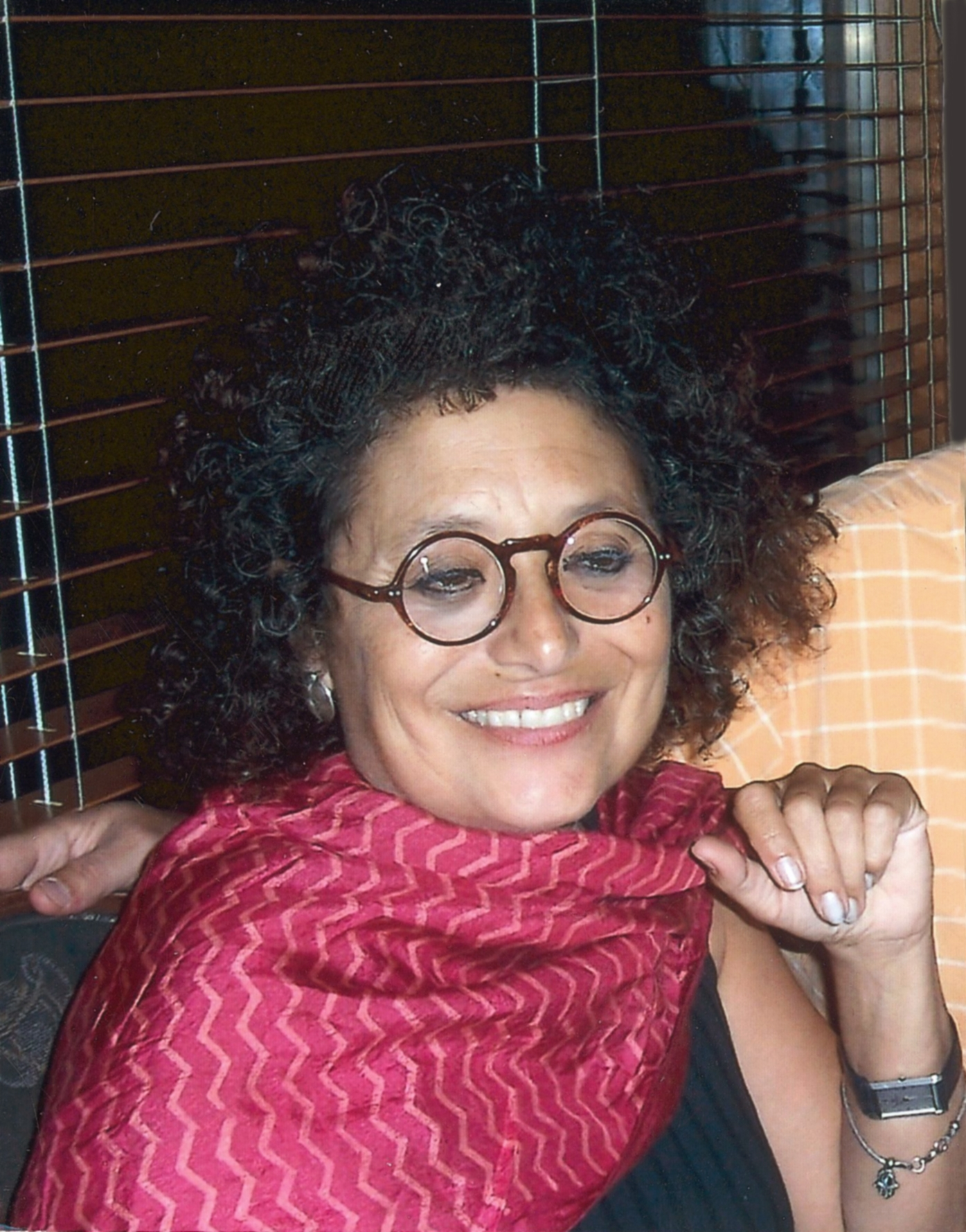
- Born: February 9, 1949 (age 77); Saint Paul, Minnesota, U.S.

Academic background
- Education: University of Minnesota (PhD)

Academic work
- Notable works: Jewish High Society in Old Regime Berlin; How Jews Became Germans

Deborah Hertz (born February 9, 1949) is an American historian whose specialties are modern German history, modern Jewish history and modern European women's history. Her current research focuses on the history of radical Jewish women.

Since 2004, she has taught at the University of California, San Diego, as a professor of history and is the Herman Wouk Chair in Modern Jewish Studies. She is the co-founder and co-director of the Holocaust Living History Workshop at UCSD, a joint project of the UCSD Library and the Jewish Studies Program.

== Early life and education ==
Deborah Hertz was born in Saint Paul, Minnesota, in 1949 and graduated from Highland Park Senior High School in 1967. She attended New York University for two years and studied at the Hebrew University in Jerusalem for her Junior Year Abroad in 1969–70. She then returned to the United States and graduated with a major in humanities, summa cum laude, from the University of Minnesota in 1971. She remained at the University of Minnesota and received her PhD in German history in 1979.

== Career ==
After a year teaching at Pittsburg State University in Kansas, Hertz moved to the State University of New York at Binghamton in 1979 and remained there until 1996. In that year she accepted a position at Sarah Lawrence College in Bronxville, New York. Hertz joined the faculty at the University of California, San Diego as the Wouk Chair in Modern Jewish Studies in 2004.

Hertz has held visiting appointments at the Hebrew University, Tel Aviv University, the University of Haifa, and held two visiting professorships at Harvard University.

== Books ==
Hertz's first book, Jewish High Society in Old Regime Berlin (Yale, 1988 and Syracuse, 2005). It traces the rise and decline of Jewish salons in Berlin at the close of the eighteenth century. Jewish High Society appeared in a German edition called Die jüdischen Salons im alten Berlin, published by Deutsche Taschenbuch Verlag. A new edition of the German translation with a new preface appeared in July 2018, published by the Europäische Verlagsanstalt.

"For the first time a serious attempt is made to ascertain precisely why the salons came to exist at this time; why in Berlin; who frequented them; and for what reasons."—Lionel Kochan, Journal of Jewish Studies

"A rich, sophisticated, and original social history. It contributes to our knowledge and understanding of German history in a period whose social aspects have long been neglected by scholars. It also makes a significant contribution to Jewish history and to women’s history."—Mary Nolan, New York University

"An interesting and amusing book about this era."—Alexander Zvielli, Jerusalem Post

Her second book is How Jews Became Germans: The History of Conversion and Assimilation in Berlin (Yale, 2007). It examines the frequency and significance of Jewish conversion to the Lutheran faith from the seventeenth century to the nineteenth century. This book has also been translated into German under the title Wie Juden Deutsche wurden: Die Welt jüdischer Konvertiten vom 17. bis zum 19. Jahrhundert, published by Campus Verlag.

"A book rich in humorous and touching vignettes, How Jews Became Germans gives human form to the themes of its history."—Christopher Clark, St. Catharine's College, Cambridge

"A wonderfully crafted book, written with great empathy. It provides a careful social and political analysis of conversion trends among Berlin's Jewish population, but avoids easy moral and historical judgments.”—Ute Frevert, Yale University

“A pioneering effort to explore a controversial subject commonly treated in all-too easy terms of ‘loyalty’ and ‘betrayal.’ Important."—Amos Elon, author of The Pity of It All: A Portrait of the German-Jewish Epoch, 1743-1933

“There is no book more exciting to read than one by an author who believes he or she was born to write it. In such books every line becomes a paragraph, every paragraph a chapter, and the book itself a never-ending story. Deborah Hertz's How Jews Became Germans is such a book.”

In addition, Deborah Hertz edited letters written by the Jewish writer Rahel Varnhagen to her friend and writer Rebecca Friedländer: Briefe an eine Freundin: Rahel Varnhagen an Rebecca Friedländer (Cologne, 1988 and 2018).

== Personal life ==
Hertz is married to Professor Martin Bunzl of Rutgers University and they have two grown children.

== Publications ==
=== Books ===
- How Jews Became Germans: The History of Conversion and Assimilation in Berlin (New Haven and London: Yale University Press, 2007) (Paperback edition Syracuse: Syracuse University Press, 2009) German edition: Wie Juden Deutsche wurden: Die Welt jüdischer Konvertiten vom 17. bis zum 19. Jahrhundert, translated by Thomas Bertrand. (Frankfurt am Main and New York: Campus Verlag, August 2010).
- Jewish High Society in Old Regime Berlin (New Haven and London: Yale University Press, 1988). The German edition of Jewish High Society has appeared with four German publishers (Frankurt am Main: M.: Anton Hain, 1991) (Munich: Deutsche Taschenbusch Verlag, 1995) (Berlin: Philo Verlag, 1998) (Hamburg: Europäische Verlagsanstalt, 2018).
- Briefe an eine Freundin: Rahel Varnhagen an Rebecca Friedländer (Cologne: Kiepenheuer and Witsch, 1988 and 2018).

=== Articles since 2011 ===
- "The Troubled Friendship between Rahel Levin and Clemens Brentano in the Shadow of the Christlich-Deutsche Tischgesellschaft", In Leo Baeck Institute Yearbook vol. 64. Oxford, England: Leo Baeck, 2019.
- "Judaism in Germany 1650-181". In The Cambridge History of Judaism, vol. 7, edited by Jonathan Karp and Adam Sutcliffe. Cambridge, England: Cambridge University Press, 2018.
- "Henriette Herz as Jew, Henriette Herz as Christian: Relationships, Conversion, Antisemitism". In Die Kommunikations-, Wissens- und Handlungsräume der Henriette Herz, edited by Hannah Lund, Ulrike Schneider and Ulrike Wels. Schriften des Frühneuzeitlichen Potsdams, vol. 5. Göttingen: Vandenhoeck und Ruprecht, 2017.
- "Manya Shochat and Her Traveling Guns: Jewish Radical Women from Pogrom Self-Defense to the First Kibbutzim". In Jews and Leftist Politics: Judaism, Israel, Antisemitism, and Gender, edited by Jack Jacobs. Cambridge, England: Cambridge University Press, 2017.
- "Love, Money, and Career in the Life of Rosa Luxemburg". In Three-Way Street: German Jews and the Transnational, edited by Jay Howard Geller and Leslie Morris. Ann Arbor: University of Michigan Press, 2016.
- "Dangerous Politics, Dangerous Liaisons: Love and Terror Among Jewish Women Radicals in Czarist Russia". In Histoire, Economie et Société (Volume 33, Number 4, 2014).
- "The Red Countess Helene von Racowitza: From the Promise of Emancipation to Suicide in 1911". In Das Emanzipationsedikt von 1812 in Preußen: Der lange Weg der Juden zu ‚Einländern‘ und ‚preußischen Staatsbürgern‘, edited by Irene Diekmann. Europäisch-jüdische Studien: Beiträge, vol. 15. Berlin: de Gruyter, 2013, the proceedings of a conference on the 200th Anniversary of the Edict of Emancipation sponsored by the Moses Mendelssohn Zentrum at the University of Potsdam.
- "Five Hundred Years of German-Jewish History Online". Transcript of a one-day conference in which Deborah Hertz was a participant, published in the Leo Baeck Institute Memorial Lecture 55 (New York and Berlin, 2012).
- "Family Love and Public Judaism: The Conversion Problematic in Nineteenth Century Germany". In Treten Sie ein! Treten Sie aus! Warum Menschen ihre Religion wechseln, edited by Regina Laudage-Kleeberg and Hannes Sulzenbacher. Berlin: Parthas, 2012.
- "Masquerades and Open Secrets, Or New Ways to Understand Jewish Assimilation". In Versteckter Glaube oder doppelte Identititäte? Das Bild des Marranentums im 19. und 20. Jahrhundert, edited by Hannah Lotte Lund, Anna-Dorothea Ludewig, and Paola Ferruta. Hildesheim, Germany: Olms Verlag, 2011.

=== Talks ===
- Visionaries, Lovers and Mothers: Radical Jewish Women from Conspiracy to Kibbutz with Deborah Hertz, 28 June 2022
  - Deborah Hertz, Professor of History and Herman Wouk Chair in Modern Jewish Studies at UC San Diego, explores why Jewish radical women became violent in early Zionism.
- Professor Deborah Hertz on Fanny von Arnstein, LBI Book Club, 25 February 2021
  - Deborah Hertz discusses at a book club, the writings of Hilde Spiel, and her book, “Fanny von Arnstein: Daughter of the Enlightenment”.
- Talent, Ambition, Wealth: Jewish Women in the Arts in the 19th Century, 22 June 2021
  - Deborah Hertz, along with several other guests, discuss the lives of three Jewish Women: Fanny Mendelssohn Hensel, Marie Barkany, and Adele Bloch-Bauer, and their contributions to arts and other social transformations of the 19th century.
