= Patrick Lee (medical researcher) =

Patrick Lee is a medical researcher and professor.

He discovered that reovirus preferentially replicates in Ras transformed cells and is therefore a good candidate for cancer therapy.

Dr. Lee holds a Ph.D. in biochemistry from the University of Alberta.

He is currently a faculty member at Dalhousie University.
