= William Heidbrink =

Plasma physicist

William Walter Heidbrink
- Education: University of California, San Diego (BA, 1977); Princeton University (PhD, 1984)
- Awards: John Dawson Award for Excellence in Plasma Physics Research (2004)
- Scientific career
- Fields: Plasma physics
- Workplaces: Maxwell Laboratories; University of California, Irvine (1988-present)
- Website: https://www.physics.uci.edu/~wwheidbr/

William Heidbrink is a plasma physicist and professor at the department of physics and astronomy at University of California, Irvine.

== Education ==
William Walter Heidbrink received his Bachelor's degree from the University of California, San Diego in 1977. For the next two years, Heidbrink pursued research in pulsed power at Maxwell Laboratories. He received his PhD from Princeton University in 1984.

== Career ==
In 1988, Heidbrink joined the physics department at University of California, Irvine (UCI). He is a professor emeritus and distinguished professor there. Heidbrink is a plasma physicist.

== Awards and honors ==
In 1996, Heidbrink was elected as an American Physical Society fellow for "quantitative studies of the confinement and thermalization of fast ions in tokamak plasmas and for discovery of several fast-ion driven instabilities."

In 2004, Heidbrink received the John Dawson Award for Excellence in Plasma Physics Research from the American Physical Society for "the theoretical Discovery and Experimental Identification of Toroidicity Induced Alfven Eigenmodes."

In 2025, Heidbrink received the James Clerk Maxwell Prize for Plasma Physics from the American Physical Society "for studies of resonant and non-resonant energetic particle transport in magnetized plasmas, innovative diagnostic methods, and the experimental discovery of detrimental fast-ion driven instabilities."

== See also ==
- List of Princeton University people
- List of University of California, San Diego people
- List of University of California, Irvine people
- List of fellows of the American Physical Society (1972–1997)
