= Claire L. Ramsey =

American linguist

Claire L Ramsey is an American linguist. Ramsey is an Associate Professor Emerita at the University of California, San Diego. She is an alumna of Gallaudet University and is former instructor at the University of Nebraska–Lincoln in Lincoln. Ramsey's research has focused on the sociolinguistics of deaf and signing communities in the US and Mexico.

== Publications ==
Ramsey is the author of two books, Deaf Children in Public Schools and The People Who Spell, both published by Gallaudet University Press. She co-authored the report titled Deaf Students as Reader and Writers: A Mixed-mode Research Approach with Carol Padden.

- Deaf Children in Public Schools is part of the Sociolinguistic in Deaf Communities series. This book profiles three American deaf children in the second grade. As many deaf students are being placed in mainstream public education in the US, Ramsey wanted to observe these children in different classroom settings; comparing all-deaf classes with mainstreamed general education classes. Ramsey's research suggests that deaf and hard-of-hearing students perform better educationally when they were in an all-deaf classroom. This is because they have full access to the course content in a visual language and the classroom environment is more accommodating to their needs.
- The People Who Spell deals with the Escuela Nacional pare Sorodundos (Mexican National School for the Deaf). This school was opened by the Mexican government in the 1860s in order to educate the deaf citizens of Mexico. The language policy of the school was to teach the students using spoken Spanish, with the goal of them learning to lipread (i.e., the oral approach). (The school closed in the 1970s.) Although the students that attended the Escuela Nacional did not use Lengua De Senas Mexicana (LSM or Mexican Sign Language) to communicate, as many modern-day deaf Mexicans do, they did pride themselves on using el deletreo, or LSM fingerspelling. The book interviews students who had attended the Escuela Nacional and they tell about their experiences at the school. One interviewee, Maria de los angeles Beodlla, expressed her feeling that when she was going to school her classmates and she were more cultured and educated then today's deaf people in Mexico. In analyzing these interviews, Ramsey identified a common theme, a sense of disappointment in how modern-day Mexico has failed its deaf citizens.
- Deaf Students as Reader and Writers: A Mixed-mode Research Approach was co-authored with Carol Padden. In this report they focused on the reading and writing skills of 135 deaf or hard-of-hearing school-aged children. Of these children, 83 attend a residential school for the deaf, and the other 52 attended a public school that had the deaf and hard-of-hearing program. Ramsey and Padden observed these children to determine if they learned how to read and write better in a residential school or public school. They found that there are other factors that contribute to a deaf child successfully learning to read and write; particularly, whether or not the child's parents or family members are also deaf. Children from deaf families tended to attend the deaf residential schools. Age detection and the length of time that they attended school were determining factors to the children's literacy successful, as well.

Ramsey's published articles include: "Classroom Discourse Practices of a Deaf Teacher Using American Sign Language" and "Ninos Milagrizados: Language Attitudes, Deaf Education, and Miracle Cures in Mexico".

- In "Classroom Discourse Practices of a Deaf Teacher Using American Sign Language" Ramsey discusses the experience of a Deaf fifth grade teacher. This teacher uses American Sign Language as a way of communication at the school she works for, where she has taught for about thirty-five years. The teacher is a native signer of ASL and she signs in her classroom. Her teaching strategies have helped her students become more interactive in the classroom.
- In "Ninos Milagrizados: Language Attitudes, Deaf Education, and Miracle Cures in Mexico" Ramsey discusses different types of "cures" they use on deaf children in Mexico. In the article, Ramsey explains that many causes of deafness are related to the culture, and that in Mexico they are trying to cure deafness because they say that the child needs to be treated right away or rehabilitated. In Mexico they are trying to make these children part of the community. They want these children to be integrated into the hearing society that they live in.

Ramsey served on the Editorial Advisory Board for several volumes of The Sociolinguistics in Deaf Communities series, published by Gallaudet University Press. Pinky Extension and Eye Gaze (1998), edited by Ceil Lucas, which explores the sociolinguistic dynamics among deaf people and signing communities. In this volume, researchers explored different areas of linguistics as applied to American Sign Language: phonological variation, language in education, discourse analysis, second language acquisition, and language attitudes. In Storytelling and Conversation: Discourse in Deaf Communities, contributors explored discourse analysis of sign languages in various countries; which included: Bali, Italy, England, and the US. The research discussed in Turn-Taking, Fingerspelling, and Contact in Sign Language focuses on sign language use by deaf people in their communities and in international contact situations.

A more recent contribution of Ramsey's was to the volume Language Acquisition by Eye, edited by Charlene Chamberlain, Jill Patterson Morford, and Rachel I. Mayberry. The chapter "Reading Ability in Signing Deaf Children" was co-authored by Ramsey and Padden. In this chapter, they discuss how deaf children learn to read; describing that knowledge of specific ASL linguistic structure correlates to reading achievement. Children that perform better on reading tests are those who have the ability to write down words that are fingerspelled to them and then are able to translate them into signs; which is often seen in children who grew up being exposed to sign language.
