= Rae Robertson-Anderson =

American biophysicist

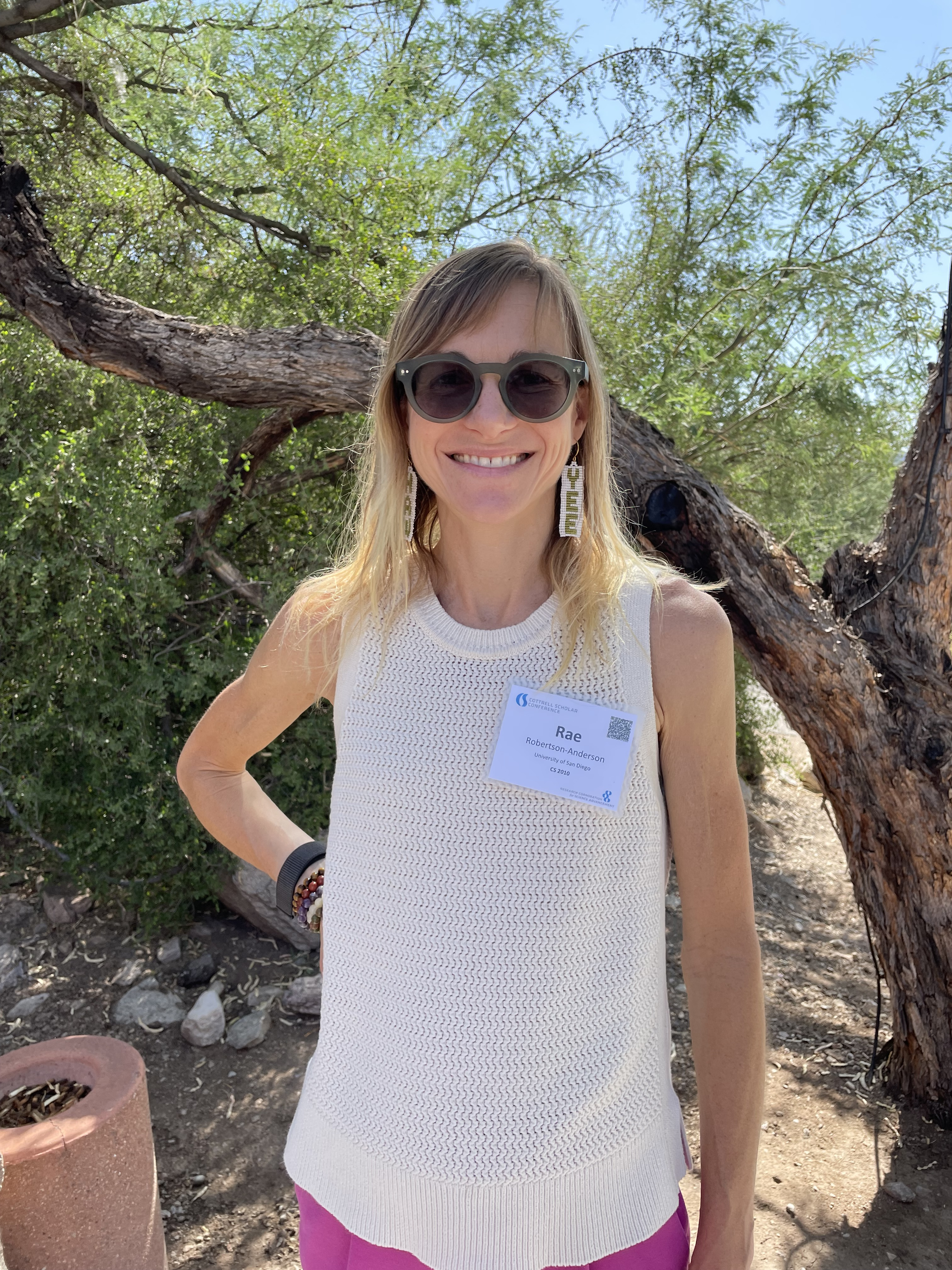
- Scientist Rae Roberson-Anderson at the 2026 Cottrell Scholar Conference
- Education: Georgetown University; University of California, San Diego
- Known for: Soft matter physics
- Scientific career
- Institutions: The Scripps Research Institute; University of San Diego

Rae Marie Robertson-Anderson is an American biophysicist who is a Professor and Associate Provost at the University of San Diego. She works on soft matter physics and is particularly interested in the transport and molecular mechanics of biopolymer networks. Robertson-Anderson is a member of the Council on Undergraduate Research.

== Early life and education ==
Robertson-Anderson grew up in Cincinnati, where she realised that she liked physics at high school. She studied physics at Georgetown University and graduated magna cum laude in 2003. She was supported by a Clare Boothe Luce scholarship to study the diffusion of granular materials. She was made a member of Phi Beta Kappa. Robertson-Anderson moved to the University of California, San Diego for her graduate studies, completing a National Science Foundation supported PhD under the supervision of Douglas Smith on single-molecule studies of DNA. She used video fluorescence microscopy and single molecule tracking to monitor the diffusion coefficients of engineered DNA. Robertson-Anderson joined The Scripps Research Institute as a postdoctoral researcher working with David Millar. She worked on single-molecule microscopy to establish the binding kinetics in HIV-1 regulatory proteins.

== Research and career ==
Robertson-Anderson joined the faculty of University of San Diego in 2009. She leads the Robertson-Anderson biophysics laboratory. She uses single-molecule microscopy and optical tweezers to understand macromolecule dynamics in soft matter. Using optical tweezer microrheology, Robertson-Anderson can measure intermolecular forces with piconewton precision. By using embedded microspheres and Stokes-Einstein relations it is possible to determine the viscoelastic properties of biomaterials.

Robertson-Anderson was awarded a United States Department of Defense Air Force Office of Scientific Research grant to study entangled DNA. She has developed optical tweezer technologies that can be used to track single molecules in actin protein networks. Networks of actin have a range of structural and dynamical properties, and respond to stress and strain. She uses fluorescence force-measuring optical tweezers to link molecular deformation (strain) and resistive forces (stress). She has also shown it is possible to use optical tweezers to transport microspheres through composite networks, measuring the forces that polymers use to resist the strain, and fluorescence microscopy to understand macromolecular mobility. She develops analysis algorithms, microfluidics and macromolecular synthesis techniques to determine the dynamics of nucleic acids. Her platform, Spatiotemporal Light-sheet Assisted Multiscale Macromolecular Transport Analysis Probe (SLAMMTAP), can be used to characterise DNA and cytoskeleton environments.

In 2015, Robertson-Anderson attended a Gordon and Betty Moore Foundation Scialog program, where she met Jenny Ross and became interested in cytoskeleton scaffolding proteins. Robertson-Anderson was awarded a W. M. Keck Foundation grant to develop autonomous materials based on cytoskeleton proteins that can use biologically-derived components, such as circadian clock proteins, to perform mechanical work. The circadian oscillator system is taken from cyanobacteria, and turns on and off in the presence of phosphate molecules. The proteins can function on the outside of living cells. The oscillators produce actomyosin, a protein complex which contracts muscle tissue.

Robertson-Anderson was made Chair of the Department of Physics and Biophysics at UCSD in 2015. She was the American Physical Society Woman of the Month in February 2017. She appeared on the Ada Lovelace Day podcast discussing her work on biological soft matter and biomaterials.

Robertson-Anderson is an advocate for undergraduate teaching and research. She is a member of the council for the Council on Undergraduate Research. She has developing a new advanced laboratory and improved the representation of women in the program at UCSD. She created the Beckman Scholarship Program to recruit talented undergraduate scientists. She has led National Science Foundation proposals to support students from underrepresented backgrounds into science, technology, engineering and maths subjects. Her undergraduate student, Stephanie Gorczyca, won the American Physical Society LeRoy Apker Award for outstanding undergraduate research. Robertson-Anderson was awarded the University of San Diego Outstanding Undergraduate Mentor Award in 2015. She was named a Fellow of the American Physical Society in 2022 "for outstanding contributions to the fundamental knowledge of a wide range of biological processes including cell division, cytoskeletal organization, DNA tethering and helicases, and other active biological systems".
