= Yu-Hwa Lo =

Chinese scientist and academic

- 羅彧華
- Occupations: Physicist, engineer, academic and researcher
- Awards: Fellow, Optical Society of America; Fellow, IEEE; Fellow, AAIA; Fellow, NAI

Academic background
- Education: National Taiwan University; University of California, Berkeley

Academic work
- Institutions: University of California at San Diego (UCSD)

Yu-Hwa Lo (Chinese: 羅彧華) is a physicist, engineer, academic and researcher. He is a professor of electrical and computer engineering at the University of California at San Diego (UCSD).

Lo has published over 500 articles and owns 58 patents. His research interests include biophotonics, single-photon detectors, condensed matter physics for advanced device concepts, microfluidics, biosensors, artificial intelligence, and biomedical systems.

Lo is the founding director and executive committee member of San Diego Nanotechnology Infrastructure (SDNI) and is the site director for the NSF National Nanotechnology Coordinated Infrastructure at UC San Diego.

== Education ==
Lo received his bachelor's degree in electrical engineering from the National Taiwan University in 1981. At the University of California, Berkeley, he completed his master's degree and Ph.D. in electrical engineering in 1986 and 1987 respectively.

== Career ==
After working at Bellcore from 1987 to 1990 as a member of technical staff, Lo became an assistant professor at Cornell University in 1991 in the School of Electrical Engineering, where he was appointed associate professor in 1996. At the University of California, San Diego since 1999, he has been a professor in the Department of Electrical and Computer Engineering, where he was awarded the Distinguished William S. C. Chang Endowed Chair in Electrical and Computer Engineering. He has been a visiting professor in the Department of Bioengineering at National Chiao Tung University in Taiwan, now part of National Yang Ming Chiao Tung University, since 2012.

Among his non-academic positions, Lo has held the position of chief technology officer and board director of Nova Crystals. He has also served as director of San Diego Nanotechnology Infrastructure, a center within the National Nanotechnology Coordinated Infrastructure, and as co-founder and advisor of NanoCellect Biomedical, Colligo Biomedical, and a consultant for biotechnology and pharmaceutical companies.

== Research ==
Lo's research is focused on two areas. The first is condensed matter photonics and optoelectronic materials and devices, with an emphasis on devices and physical mechanisms for ultrasensitive light detection with applications in imaging, LiDAR, and medical and bioimaging. The second area is microfluidics, lab-on-a-chip devices, biosensors, and biomedical instruments and technologies for single-cell analysis, multiomics, diagnosis, and drug discovery.

=== Photonic devices ===
Lo invented the direct wafer fusion process, involving the bonding of two semiconductors without an intermediate layer, with Raj Bhat. The process was licensed to industry to produce high-brightness light-emitting diodes (LEDs), contributing to the transition of traffic lights and automobile lighting from incandescent lighting to solid-state lighting. He formulated and demonstrated the concept of a compliant substrate to enable growth of epitaxial layers beyond the Matthews and Blakeslee critical thickness limit.

Along with his group, Lo developed self-quenching and self-recovering mechanisms for semiconductor detectors capable of detecting single photons. He discovered the cycling excitation process (CEP) in disordered materials and developed photodetectors with intrinsic carrier multiplication gain based on this mechanism. The devices have applications in LiDAR and low-light imaging. By applying quantum mechanical principles, his group developed a model connecting fundamental physics to the operation of colloidal quantum dot heterojunctions. The work proposed that inter-dot resonant tunneling through ligands can be modeled as a diffusion process, allowing an effective diffusivity to be represented by parameters of the ligand molecules and solid-state cores.

=== Biomedical devices ===
Lo's group invented a bench-top microfluidic fluorescence-activated cell sorter (FACS), described as a compact version of the technology.

Lo's laboratory later integrated imaging capabilities into flow cytometry systems, including image-guided FACS systems and AI-enabled image-guided cell sorters. These systems associated cellular morphological features with genomic and proteomic information, expanding the scope of multiomics analysis.

His lab also developed high-throughput 3D imaging flow cytometry methods and incorporated artificial intelligence for cell analysis, classification, and cell-type discovery.

Lo's group developed a physics-based analytical model for lateral flow assays (LFAs), relating device performance to underlying physical parameters. LFAs, including tests used for COVID-19 and pregnancy tests, are generally less sensitive than qPCR-based methods; the model provides a framework for analyzing and optimizing their performance. This work was applied to a fentanyl detection assay reported by the American Institute of Physics to be about 100 times more sensitive than commercial strips.

== Selected honors ==
- Optica Fellow (2005)
- IEEE Fellow (2006)
- Fellow, National Academy of Inventors (2022)

== Bibliography ==
- Lo, Y. H. (1991). New approach to grow pseudomorphic structures over the critical thickness. Applied Physics Letters, 59(18), 2311–2313.
- Bhat, R., & Lo, Y. H. (1993). U.S. Patent No. 5,207,864. Washington, DC: U.S. Patent and Trademark Office.
- Berdichevsky, Y., Khandurina, J., Guttman, A., & Lo, Y. H. (2004). UV/ozone modification of poly (dimethylsiloxane) microfluidic channels. Sensors and Actuators B: Chemical, 97(2-3), 402–408.
- Soci, C., Zhang, A., Xiang, B., Dayeh, S. A., Aplin, D. P. R., Park, J., ... & Wang, D. (2007). ZnO nanowire UV photodetectors with high internal gain. Nano letters, 7(4), 1003–1009.
- Park, J. H., Ndao, A., Cai, W., Hsu, L., Kodigala, A., Lepetit, T., ... & Kanté, B. (2020). Symmetry-breaking-induced plasmonic exceptional points and nanoscale sensing. Nature Physics, 16(4), 462–468.
