= Angela N. Brooks =

American biologist and geneticist

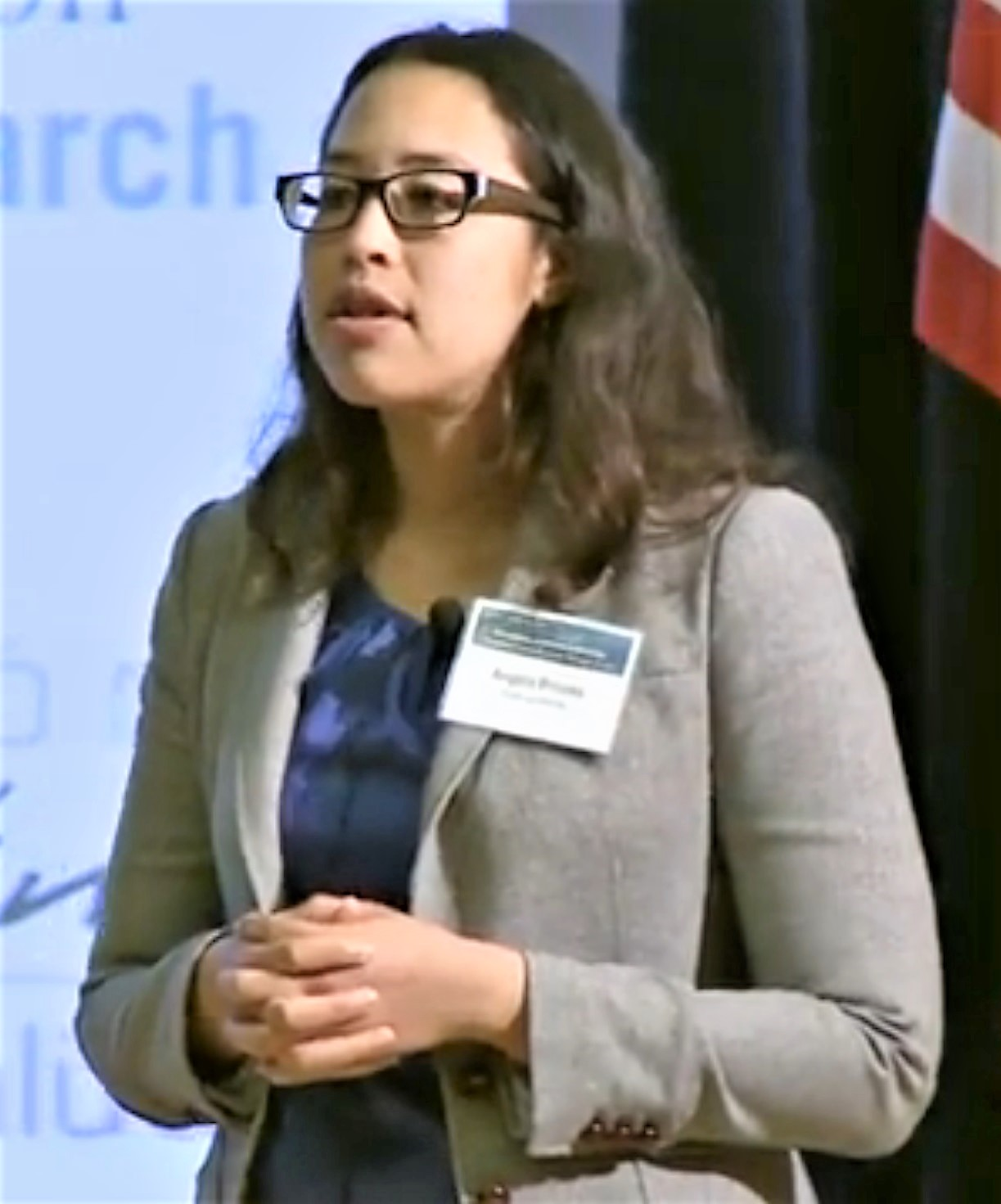
- Angela Brooks speaks at the Cancer Genome Atlas 4th Annual Scientific Symposium in 2015
- Education: University of California, Berkeley; University of California, San Diego
- Scientific career
- Workplaces: University of California, Santa Cruz; Dana–Farber Cancer Institute
- Website: Brooks Lab

Angela Brooks is an Assistant Professor of Biomolecular Engineering at University of California, Santa Cruz. She is a member of the Genomics Institute.

== Early life and education ==
After watching Gattaca in 1997, Brooks was inspired to study genetics. She studied biology at the University of California, San Diego, where she specialized in bioinformatics. She became interested in alternative splicing, and decided to focus on this for her doctoral studies. She moved to University of California, Berkeley for her graduate program, working with Steven E. Brenner. During her doctorate, she worked on Modencode, a project which looked to create an encyclopedia of the elements in the Drosophila melanogaster genomes. She created JuncBASE (junction-based analysis of splicing events), a program which analysed high-throughput sequencing data generated. Brooks was a postdoctoral fellow at the Dana–Farber Cancer Institute, where she worked with Matthew Meyerson. Here she studied the cancerous effects of mutation in U2 small nuclear RNA auxiliary factor 1 (U2AF1) and SF3B1. U2AF1 is frequently mutated in adenocarcinoma of the lung and myeloid leukemia, and SF3B1 in lymphoid leukemia.

== Research and career ==
Brooks set up an alternative splicing lab at University of California, Santa Cruz in 2015. She uses nanopore sequencing for full length RNA sequencing. In 2016 she was awarded a grant from the Santa Cruz Cancer Benefit Group (SCCBG) to examine genetic changes in lung cancer that lead to altered gene processing. She co-lead the PanCancer Analysis of Whole Genomes (PCAWG) RNA working group and is the corresponding author on the PCAWG RNA paper. She also presented her PCAWG work at the AACR Annual Meeting in 2017 as part of a Major Symposia.

On March 2, 2020, she was appointed the Diversity Director for the UCSC Genomics Institute. In 2020 she received two grants to build diversity at the UCSC Genomics Institute including the UC Santa Cruz Training Program In Genomic Sciences and UCSC Research Mentoring Internship Program: An Initiative to Increase Diversity and Inclusion in Genomics Research.

=== Awards and honours ===
Her awards and honours include;

- 2017 The Scientist One to Watch
- 2018 University of California, Santa Cruz Women in Science and Engineering Award
- 2018 Pew Scholar
- 2019 Tobacco-Related Disease Research Program Award
- 2020 NIH/NIGMS R35 Maximizing Investigators' Research Award
