= Joellen Russell =

American oceanographer and climate scientist (born 1970)

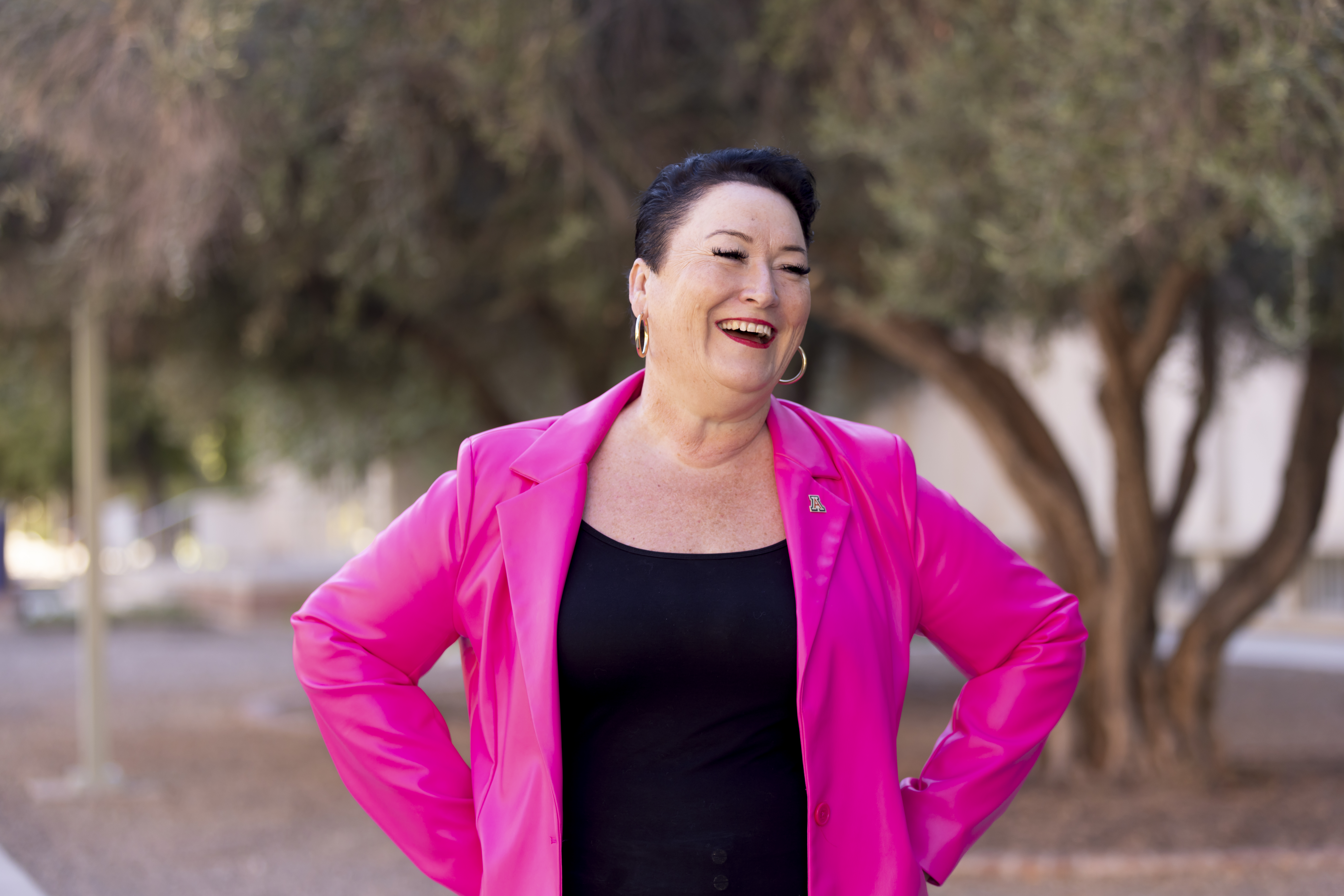
- Born: Joellen Louise Russell; 1970 (age 55–56); Seattle, WA
- Education: Harvard University; University of California, San Diego (PhD)
- Occupations: Oceanographer, climate scientist

Joellen Louise Russell (born 1970) is an American oceanographer and climate scientist.

Russell is a Distinguished Professor in the Department of Geosciences at the University of Arizona in Tucson, AZ. She has joint appointments in the Departments of Lunar and Planetary Sciences, Hydrology and Atmospheric Sciences, and in the Mathematics Department's Program in Applied Mathematics. In 2017, she was named as the Thomas R. Brown Distinguished Chair of Integrative Science. Russell is the current US Executive Committee member of the International Association of the Physical Sciences of the Oceans (IAPSO). She is one of the founding members of Science Moms.

== Early life and education ==
Russell was born in Seattle, WA in 1970, and grew up in Kotzebue, Alaska, a fishing village 30 miles north of the Arctic Circle, where her father worked for the Indian Health Service. At age 12, she knew she wanted to be an oceanographer. Russell attended St. Paul's School in Concord, NH, received a School Year Abroad in Rennes, France, and was a Radcliffe National Scholar at Harvard University, where she earned an A.B. in Environmental Geoscience. She had her first research cruise to the Southern Ocean in 1994, and spent nearly a year of her graduate career at sea before completing her PhD in Oceanography in 1999 from the Scripps Institution of Oceanography, University of California, San Diego. She earned a JISAO Postdoctoral Fellowship at the University of Washington, and then spent several years as a research scientist at Princeton University and the NOAA Geophysical Fluid Dynamics Laboratory in Princeton, NJ during the preparation for the 4th Assessment by the Intergovernmental Panel on Climate Change (IPCC-AR4). Russell became a member of the faculty of the Department of Geosciences at the University of Arizona in 2006, and became a full professor in 2019. She served as the Department Head from August 2023 through June 2025.

== Career and impact of research ==
Russell's research explores the role of the ocean in the global climate, focusing on the Southern Ocean and the Southern Hemisphere westerly winds. She uses robot floats, supercomputers, and satellites to study the Southern Ocean and the ocean's role in the transient global climate. Russell uses earth system models to simulate the climate and carbon cycle of the past, the present, and the future, and develops observationally-based metrics to evaluate these simulations. Russell's work on the westerly winds led to her greatest research accomplishment so far: the creation of a new paradigm in climate science, namely that warmer climates produce stronger westerly winds. This insight solved one of the long-standing climate paradoxes, the mechanism responsible for transferring one-third of the carbon dioxide in the atmosphere into the ocean and then back out again during our repeated glacial-interglacial cycles. More recently, Russell and her glaciologist colleagues have published a mechanism, called the "Zealandia Switch" through which a change in the Southern Hemisphere westerly winds can initiate a "big, fast, and global" transition and explain the synchronous glacial retreat in New Zealand, North America, the European Alps and Patagonia during the same 200 yr interval at the end of the last ice age. In 2023, she contributed to an article examining the ongoing process of ocean carbon cycle research as it relates to climate change and the range of resources that are currently being incorporated into comprehensive studies about this subject.

Russell is the lead for the modeling theme of the Southern Ocean Carbon and Climate Observations and Modeling project (SOCCOM) including its Southern Ocean Model Intercomparison Project (SOMIP). She is the current US Executive Committee member of the International Association of the Physical Sciences of the Oceans (IAPSO). Previously, she served as the chair of the NOAA Science Advisory Board's Climate Working Group, as an Objective Leader for the Scientific Committee on Antarctic Research's AntarcticClimate21, and on the National Center for Atmospheric Research (NCAR) Community Earth System Model (CESM) advisory board.

== Impact ==
Russell is one of the 14 climate scientists behind an amicus curiae brief supporting the plaintiff in the historic 2007 U.S. Supreme Court decision on carbon dioxide emissions and climate change, Commonwealth of Massachusetts, et al. v. U.S. Environmental Protection Agency. This amicus brief was the only one cited in this landmark decision that established that carbon dioxide is an atmospheric pollutant and that the EPA must regulate it.

In 2020, Russell and Dr. Katherine Hayhoe founded Science Moms, a nonpartisan group of climate scientists, who are also mothers, working to demystify climate change.

== Awards and recognition ==
- 2024: Invited Lead Keynote, GreenAccord Cultural Association's XVI International Media Forum on the Safeguard of Nature: Building Future Together, Frascati, Italy
- 2024: Invited Speaker, National Science Foundation: Division of Ocean Sciences, "Frontiers in Ocean Sciences Symposium"
- 2023: US Fulbright Scholar (working at the National Institute for Water and Atmospheric Research (NIWA) in Wellington, New Zealand)
- 2021: University Distinguished Professor, University of Arizona
- 2017 – present: Thomas R. Brown Distinguished Chair of Integrative Science
- 2014 – 1885: Society Distinguished Scholar Award, University of Arizona
- 2012 – present: Member, Comer Family Foundation "Changelings" group
- 2011 – 2012: Distinguished Lecturer, American Association of Petroleum Geologists
- 2010: Provost's General Education Teaching Award, University of Arizona
- 1989 – 1993: Radcliffe National Scholar, Harvard University, Cambridge, MA
