= JoAnn Trejo =

American academic pharmacologist

- Education: University of California, Davis University of California, San Diego
- Employer(s): University of California, San Diego
- Website: https://sites.ucsd.edu/trejolab/

JoAnn Trejo is an American pharmacologist, cell biologist, and professor in the Department of Pharmacology, School of Medicine at University of California, San Diego. She is also the senior assistant vice chancellor for Health Sciences Faculty Affairs. Trejo studies cell signalling by protease-activated G protein-coupled receptors (GPCRs) in inflammation and cancer.

== Early life and education ==
Trejo was born in French Camp California, January 23, 1964, and raised in Stockton in San Joaquin County, California. She grew up the youngest of five children in a single-parent household of Mexican migrant farm workers. Trejo graduated from Saint Mary's High School and obtained a bachelor's of science from the University of California, Davis in 1986. She earned her PhD in Physiology and Pharmacology at University of California, San Diego in 1992 and an MBA from the Rady School of Management at University of California, San Diego in 2015.

== Career ==
Trejo completed postdoctoral training with Professor Shaun Coughlin at the Cardiovascular Research Institute (CVRI), University of California, San Francisco. In 2000, she joined the faculty as an assistant professor in the Department of Pharmacology at University of North Carolina, Chapel Hill. She was recruited to University of California, San Diego as a tenured associate professor in the Department of Pharmacology in 2008 and was promoted to full professor in 2012. In 2014, she was appointed vice chair of the Department of Pharmacology. In 2015, she became the associate dean for Health Sciences Faculty Affairs and was appointed assistant vice chancellor in 2019 and senior assistant vice chancellor for Health Sciences Faculty Affairs in 2023. Trejo is responsible for developing and implementing data-driven strategies, initiatives and programs for enhancing success, recruitment, and retention of faculty across Health Sciences at University of California, San Diego.

== Research interests ==
Trejo studies the regulatory mechanisms that control signalling by protease-activated receptors, a family of G protein-coupled receptors (GPCRs) with critical functions in vascular inflammation and cancer. She has been continuously funded by the NIH as an independent investigator and has authored over a hundred peer-reviewed research papers. She is known for her discoveries of mechanisms that govern activated GPCR biased signaling, endosomal signaling and signal regulation by the multi-functional beta- and alpha-arrestin adaptor proteins in the context of endothelial dysfunction and progression of triple-negative breast cancer. She is associate editor for Molecular Biology of the Cell, serves on the editorial boards for the Journal of Biological Chemistry, Molecular Pharmacology, Current Opinion in Cell Biology, and PNAS Nexus. Trejo is engaged in an additional area of research that is focused on understanding factors that enhance success of early career faculty in academic medicine and science as well as postdoctoral fellow transition to the professoriate.

== Mentoring and training the next generation of scientists ==
Trejo mentors and advances the success of early career faculty and postdoctoral fellows. She has trained over 100 postdocs, graduate students and undergraduate students in her laboratory. She is the director of the NIH-funded IRACDA program at University of California, San Diego, which has trained over 130 postdocs, of which 65% have transitioned to the professoriate as tenure-track faculty. She also leads NIH-funded research education programs that investigate the professional trajectories of early career faculty in academic medicine and science. Trejo has assisted many early career faculty at University of California, San Diego, particularly in research development and grant writing.

== Awards ==
JoAnn Trejo has received multiple awards for her research and mentoring.

- In 1992, she was awarded the National Research Council Ford Foundation Dissertation Fellowship
- In 1993, she received the University of California President's Postdoctoral Fellowship Award
- In 1995, she was granted the American Heart Association Scientist Career Development Award
- In 2001, Trejo received the North Carolina Biotechnology Center Institutional Development Award
- In 2005, she received the Susan G. Komen Breast Cancer Foundation Award
- In 2006, Trejo received the American Heart Association Established Investigator Award
- In 2009 & 2017, she received UC Tobacco-Related Disease Research Program Awards
- In 2012, she was recognized by the San Diego Business Journal with the Women Who Mean Business Award
- In 2014, Trejo was honored with the UC San Diego Chancellor's Award for Excellence in Postdoctoral Scholar Mentoring
- In 2015, she received the Ruth Kirchstein Award for Maximizing Access in Science American Society for Biochemistry and Molecular Biology
- In 2017, she was recognized with the E.E. Just Lecture Award by the American Society for Cell Biology (ASCB)
- In 2018, Trejo earned the NIH/NIGMS R35 Maximizing Investigators' Research Award (MIRA)
- In 2019, she was recognized with Society for the Advancement of Chicanos and Native Americans in Science Outstanding Mentor Award
- In 2020, Trejo was granted the American Society for Cell Biology Prize for Excellence in Inclusivity
- In 2020, she was also named to Cell Mentor's list of 100 Inspiring Hispanic/Latinx Scientists in America
- In 2020, Trejo was honored as an elected Fellow of the American Society for Cell Biology
- In 2021, Trejo was distinguished as an elected as a member of the National Academy of Medicine
- In 2024, Trejo was bestowed an elected Honorary Fellow of the British Pharmacological Society
- In 2025, she was recognized with an Honorary degree, Doctor of Science (honoris causa) from the University of Connecticut
- In 2025, Trejo was elected as an Honorary Fellow of the American Association for the Advancement of Science (AAAS)
