= Michael Petach =

American engineer (1959–2024)

Michael Petach (December 30, 1959 – June 25, 2024) was an American engineer who made contributions in the fields of cryogenics and thermoacoustics in developing systems for space applications. He worked as an engineer for Northrop Grumman. His notable work revolved around developing cryocoolers and the traveling-wave thermoacoustic electric generator, a technology that enhances the efficiency of power generation for spacecraft. He contributed to the development of the cryocooler system for the James Webb Space Telescope's Mid-Infrared Instrument (MIRI) and worked on cryocooler concepts for the Origins Space Telescope.

Born in Upper Darby Township, Pennsylvania and raised in Woodland Hills, CA (a suburb of Los Angeles), Petach studied Mechanical engineering at the University of California, San Diego.

== TASHE ==
Inspired by Robert Stirling's 19th-century engine, Petach, along with Scott Backhaus, and Emanuel Tward, developed the thermoacoustic-Stirling heat engine (TASHE) that was first published in Applied Physics Letters. He had previously published on thermoacoustics in space applications. TASHE uses intense sound waves to convert up to 18 percent of heat source energy into electricity for spacecraft, a significant improvement compared to prior thermoelectric generators, which converted about 7% of heat energy into electrical energy. This increased efficiency enhanced the power and capabilities of deep space probes, aligning with the goals of NASA's Project Prometheus and missions like the Jupiter Icy Moons Orbiter.

TASHE employs sound waves produced by thermal differences to generate electricity. The system's core includes a regenerator composed of stainless-steel wire-mesh discs, through which helium gas oscillates due to temperature differences created by a heat source and a heat sink. This oscillation produces sound waves that drive a piston in a linear alternator, converting acoustic energy into electrical energy. This design features minimal moving parts, primarily the helium gas and an ambient temperature piston, contributing to the system's high reliability, crucial for long-duration space missions where maximizing power output from limited energy sources is essential.

== Cryocoolers ==
Petach made significant contributions to the development and advancement of cryocoolers, particularly in space applications. Cryocoolers are devices that maintain extremely low temperatures for sensors in satellites and space telescopes, enabling them to function properly for long-term missions and capture high-quality images of Earth and deep space.

He was involved in the design, analysis, and testing of pulse tube cryocoolers, focusing on improving their performance and reliability. His notable projects include work on the Mid-Infrared Instrument (MIRI) cryocooler for the James Webb Space Telescope, which has been crucial for cooling infrared detectors to very low temperatures in space environments. He also worked on cryocooling technolgogies for the development of the Origins Space Telescope.
