= Andrew Mattison =

American medical psychologist (1948–2005)

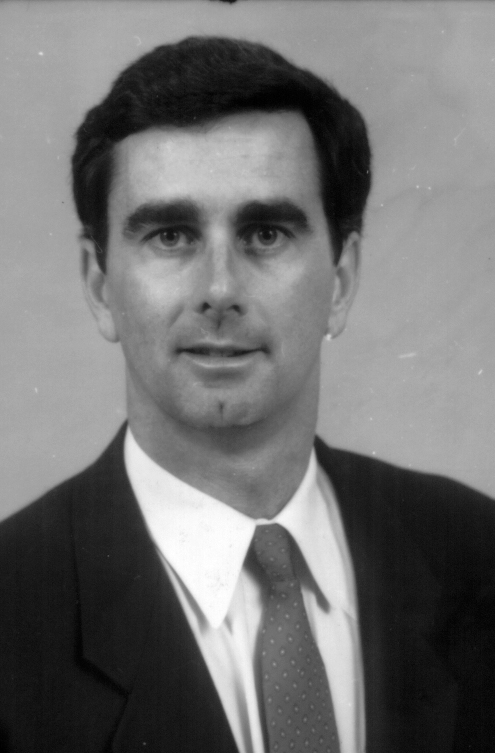
- Mattison c. 1978
- Born: Andrew Michael Mattison; August 5, 1948; New York City, U.S.
- Died: December 29, 2005 (aged 57)
- Education: Xaverian High School; Fairfield University; Stony Brook University; United States International University (PhD)
- Occupation: Medical psychologist
- Scientific career
- Fields: Medical psychology, sexology

Andrew Michael Mattison (August 5, 1948 – December 29, 2005) was an American medical psychologist and researcher. He performed influential research in both clinical and social aspects of sexology, as well as drug use. He spent the majority of his career as a professor, practicing psychotherapist, and research scientist at the University of California, San Diego.

== Early life ==
Mattison was born in Brooklyn, NY. He graduated from Xaverian High School in 1966 and got his Bachelor's Degree in English Literature at Fairfield University. He graduated with a Master's in social work from the Stony Brook University in New York. He received his Ph.D. from United States International University (now Alliant International University) in 1975, with the dissertation Onset of Erectile Dysfunction in Diabetic Males. His best-known book was The Male Couple: How Relationships Develop, coauthored with his partner David McWhirter (March 29, 1932 - July 28, 2006). The book argued that gay male relationships have particular tendencies distinct from other categories of sexual relationships, an innovative thesis that encouraged the growth of a new field, homosexuality studies. However, the book was also used by anti-gay marriage activists in legal arguments.

== Career ==
Mattison later began studying the use of party drugs by gay men, a controversial subject, which eventually led to a more thorough investigation of drug use in general. In 2000 he cofounded the University of California Center for Medicinal Cannabis Research, of which he was co-director until his death.

He died of stomach cancer at the age of 57.
