= Martin Bunzl =

American philosopher

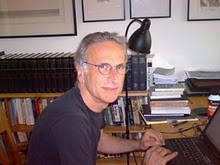
Martin Bunzl

Martin Bunzl (born 1948, in London, England) is professor of philosophy emeritus at Rutgers University in New Brunswick, NJ, where he directed the Rutgers Initiative in Climate and Social Policy from 2007 to 2011.

== Biography ==
Bunzl graduated from the University of Minnesota, from which he obtained a BA and a Ph.D. His early work dealt primarily with causation, in which he developed a deflationary account of causal overdetermination; what David Lewis called "Bunzl events".

In the Philosophy of History, Bunzl's focus has been on the ontological commitments of historians, including their use of counterfactuals. Natalie Zemon Davis, author of The Return of Martin Guerre and Society and Culture in Early Modern France, has written of Martin Bunzl's Real History: [the book] "provides a breath of fresh air in writing on the philosophy and epistemology of history. In language accessible to historians, philosophers, and the reading public more generally, he explores the questions posed by the various 'turns' of the post-war decades: deconstructive, linguistic, literary, anthropological, and quantitative. He looks not just at what historians say about their methods, but at what they actually do."

With a specialty in the Philosophy of Science, he is the author of The Context Of Explanation, Real History and Uncertainty and the Philosophy of Climate Change, and co-editor of Buying Freedom and Foundational Issues in Human Brain Mapping, as well as numerous scholarly articles.

Bunzl's recently completed research has been in the area of catastrophic risk. His book, Beyond Risk and Reward: Rethinking Choice in an Uncertain World is forthcoming in 2027. He is currently writing about Threshold Deontology.

== Publications ==
Books

- Beyond Risk and Reward: Rethinking Choice in an Uncertain World , Cambridge: Open Book Publishers, forthcoming.
- Uncertainty and the Philosophy of Climate Change, London: Routledge, 2015.
- Real History, London: Routledge, 1997.
- The Context of Explanation, Dordrecht: Kluwer Academic, 1993.

Edited Books

- Foundational Issues of Neuroimaging, edited with Stephen Hanson, Cambridge: MIT Press, 2010.
- Buying Freedom: The Ethics and Economics of Contemporary Slave Redemption, edited with Anthony Appiah, Princeton: Princeton University Press, 2007.

Selected Articles

- "Geoengineering Harms and Compensation", Stanford Journal of Law, Science & Policy, Vol. 4, 2011, pp. 70–76.
- “A Test for Geoengineering?”, Science, Vol. 237, 2010, pp. 530–531 (with Alan Robock, Ben Kravitz, and Georgiy L. Stenchikov)
- “Geoengineering Research: Shouldn't or Couldn't?”, Environmental Research Letters, Vol. 4, 2009, pp. 1–3.
- “The Tragedy of the Commons: A Reassessment”, Climatic Change, Vol. 97, 2009, pp. 59–65.
- "The Next Best Thing," in Buying Freedom: The Ethics and Economics of Contemporary Slave Redemption, Anthony Appiah and Martin Bunzl eds., Princeton: Princeton University Press, 2007, pp. 235–248.
- “Laws without Possibility”, Philosophia, Vol. 31, 2004, pp. 475–485.
- “Counterfactual History: A User’s Guide”, American Historical Review, Vol. 109, 2004, pp. 845–858.
- “Real World Epistemic Under-determination”, Philosophia, Vol. 31, 2004, pp. 139–147.
- “Conventions Made too Simple?”, Philosophy of the Social Sciences, Vol. 33, 2003, pp. 417–426 (with Richard Kreuter).
- “Evolutionary Games without Rationality?”, Philosophy of the Social Sciences, Vol. 32, 2002, pp. 365–378.
- “Baseball and Biology”, Philosophia, Vol. 27, 1999, pp. 575–580.
- "The Construction of History”, Journal of Women's History, Vol. 9, 1997, pp. 119–131.
- “The Logic of Thought Experiments”, Synthese, Vol. 106, 1996, pp. 227–240.
- “How to Change the Unchanging Past”, Clio, Vol. 25, 1996, pp. 181–194.
- "Non-cognitive Meaning Revisited”, Canberra Anthropology, Vol.19, 1996, pp. 1–14.
- "Archaeology without Excess”, Philosophical Forum, Vol.27, 1995, pp. 27–36.
- "Pragmatism to the Rescue?", Journal for the History of Ideas, Vol. 20, 1995, pp. 675–680.
- "Meaning's Reach", Journal for the Theory of Social Behaviour, Vol. 24, 1994, pp. 267–280.
- "Scientific Abstraction and the Realist Impulse", Philosophy of Science, Vol. 61, 1994, pp. 449–456, reprinted in A.Zucker, ed., Science and Its Philosophies (New York: Prentice Hall, 1995).
- "Reductionism & The Mental”, American Philosophical Quarterly, Vol. 24, 1987, pp. 181–190.
- "A Causal Model for Causal Priority”, Erkenntnis, Vol. 21, 1984, pp. 31–44.
- "Causal Factuals”, Erkenntnis, Vol. 21, 1984, pp. 367–384.
- "Humean Counterfactuals”, Journal for the History of Philosophy, Vol. 20, 1982, pp. 171–177
- "The Meaning of Meaningful Behavior”, Journal for the Theory of Social Behaviour, Vol. 12, 1982, pp. 21–27.
- "A Note on Doing”, Dialogue, Vol. 19, 1980, pp. 629–631.
- "Causal Preemption and Counterfactuals”, Philosophical Studies, Vol. 37, 1980, pp. 629–631.
- "Comment on 'Health as a Theoretical Concept'", Philosophy of Science, Vol 49, 1980, pp. 116–118.
- "Causal Overdetermination”, Journal of Philosophy, Vol. 76, 1979, pp. 134–150.
