= Steven E. Wilson =

American ophthalmologist

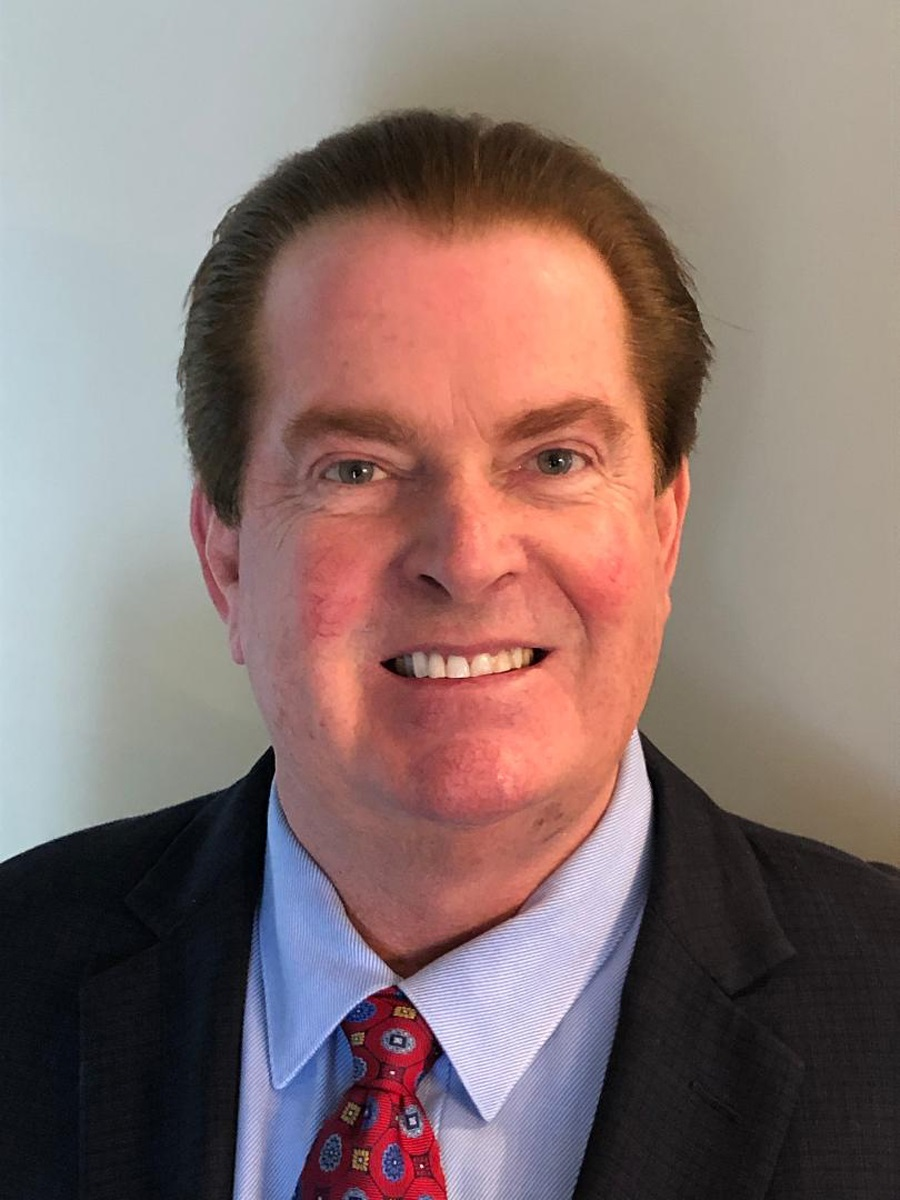
- Born: Steven Eugene Wilson; 1951 (age 74–75); Oklahoma City
- Education: M.D., University of California, San Diego
- Medical career
- Profession: Surgeon, scientist, author
- Institutions: Cleveland Clinic
- Sub-specialties: Ophthalmology, cell and molecular biology
- Website: https://my.clevelandclinic.org/staff/1882-steven-wilson

Steven Eugene Wilson (born 1951) is an American ophthalmologist and professor at Cleveland Clinic, where he is a surgeon and directs corneal research. He has also received honors for several published historical fiction novels.

His research has focused on corneal cellular responses to injury and surgery, with his most-cited work being about keratocyte apoptosis, as well as cellular and molecular interactions involved in homeostasis, wound healing, and diseases of the cornea. He holds two United States patents related to corneal healing. He previously served as a professor and chair of the Department of Ophthalmology at the University of Washington in Seattle from 1998 to 2003, and was named Grace E. Hill Endowed Chair in Vision Research.

== Medical training and career ==
Though born in Oklahoma City, Wilson grew up in Whittier, California. He completed his undergraduate degree in biology from California State University, Fullerton in 1974 and a master's degree in molecular biology and biochemistry from University of California, Irvine in 1977. He received his doctor of medicine degree from University of California, San Diego in 1984. The early part of his career saw him completing residency at the Mayo Clinic and taking professor and research roles at various universities. He served as a professor and Chair of the Department of Ophthalmology at the University of Washington in Seattle from 1998 to 2003, and was named Grace E. Hill Endowed Chair in Vision Research.

Since 2003, he has been professor of ophthalmology and staff cornea and refractive surgeon at the Cleveland Clinic in Ohio, and he has served as the cornea and refractive fellowship director there 2006–2017. Wilson is the inventor of topical losartan treatment for corneal scarring/fibrosis. Wilson's laboratory studying corneal wound healing was funded by the National Eye Institute and the U.S. Department of Defense from 1993 to 2025.

== Historical fiction author ==
Wilson said of his accomplishments outside of ophthalmology, that writing fiction is a “great pleasure” and a treasured hobby. His first novel, Winter in Kandahar, was a 2004 finalist for the Benjamin Franklin Award for Best New Voice in Fiction. A second novel, Ascent from Darkness, was a finalist in the Action/Adventure category (2008) in the Indie Book Awards. Wilson's third novel, The Ghosts of Anatolia, received multiple awards in 2010 and 2011. A more recent novel, The Benghazi Affair was the Benjamin Franklin Award Audio Book Gold Prize winner in fiction.
