= Lu Jeu Sham =

American physicist (born 1938)

- Born: 沈呂九; 28 April 1938 (age 88); British Hong Kong
- Education: Imperial College London (BSc); University of Cambridge (PhD)
- Known for: Kohn–Sham equations; Density functional theory (DFT)
- Scientific career
- Fields: Physics
- Workplaces: University of California, San Diego
- Doctoral students: Sung Ryul Eric Yang

Lu Jeu Sham (Chinese: 沈呂九) (born April 28, 1938) is an American physicist. He is best known for his work with Walter Kohn on the Kohn–Sham equations.

== Biography ==
Lu Jeu Sham's family was from Fuzhou, Fujian, but he was born in British Hong Kong on April 28, 1938. He was graduated from the Pui Ching Middle School in 1955 and then traveled to England for his higher education. He received his Bachelor of Science in mathematics (1st class honours) from Imperial College, University of London in 1960 and his PhD in physics from the University of Cambridge in 1963. In 1963–1966, he worked with Prof. W. Kohn as a postdoctoral fellow at the University of California, San Diego. From 1966 to 1967, Sham worked in University of California, Irvine as assistant professor in Physics and from 1967 to 1968 in Queen Mary College, University of London as a Reader. He joined the faculty of University of California in 1968. Sham was a professor in the Department of Physics at University of California, San Diego, eventually serving as department head. He is now a UCSD professor emeritus.

Sham was elected to the National Academy of Sciences in 1998.

== Scientific contributions ==
Sham is noted for his work on density functional theory (DFT) with Walter Kohn, which resulted in the Kohn–Sham equations of DFT. The Kohn–Sham method is widely used in materials science. Kohn received a Nobel Prize in Chemistry in 1998 for the Kohn–Sham equations and other work related to DFT.

Sham's other research interests include condensed matter physics and optical control of electron spins in semiconductor nanostructures for quantum information processing.

== Honors and awards ==
- Member of the US National Academy of Sciences (1998)
- Member of Academia Sinica (1998)
- Fellow of American Association for the Advancement of Science (2011)
- Fellow of American Physics Society (1977)
- Fellow of Optica (formerly OSA) (2009)
- The Willis E. Lamb Award for Laser Science and Quantum Optics (2004)
- The MRS Materials Theory Award (2019)
- Humboldt Foundation Award (1978)
- Guggenheim Fellowship (1983)
