= Center for Research in Computing and the Arts =

The Center for Research in Computing and the Arts (CRCA) was an interdisciplinary organized research unit of UCSD in San Diego, California. CRCA provided support for numerous projects that intersect with the fields of New Media Art, Software Studies, Game studies, Art/Science collaborations, Mixed Reality, Experimental Music, Digital Audio, Immersive Art, and Networked Performance over its 40 year history. CRCA was originally founded by composer Roger Reynolds as the Center for Music Experiment (CME) in 1972, and was directed for many years by F. Richard Moore. The center was renamed and the scope widened when artist and artificial intelligence pioneer Harold Cohen became the director in 1993.

Projects emerging from CRCA have been seen at venues including SIGGRAPH, Ars Electronica, ISEA, and the Whitney Museum of Art as well as numerous museums, galleries, and scientific contexts.

CRCA, as an Organized Research Unit (ORU) at UCSD, ended on July 1, 2012. The functions, support and facilities that CRCA managed were folded into Calit2.

== Institutional Collaborations ==
CRCA worked closely in collaboration with art and science institutions including Calit2, UCLA, UCSD Visual Arts Department, UCSD Music Department, UC DARNet, the Sanford Burnham Medical Research Institute, the San Diego Supercomputer Center, and the UCSD School of Medicine.

== Art and Science Research ==
Artists and researchers at CRCA have been involved in numerous technoscience research projects, such as Sheldon Brown's work on Game Design focusing on algorithmic generation of 3D game environments in Scalable City, the Software Studies Initiative's work developing data visualizations of large sets of cultural data and Micha Cárdenas' 365 hour Becoming Dragon project, about which Katherine sweetman of San Diego City Beat said "nobody has ever 'lived' in virtual reality continuously for so long".

== People ==
CRCA was home to artists, scientists and theorists. Some of the people involved include:

- Harold Cohen, Founding Director
- Sheldon Brown, Past Co-Director
- Miller Puckette, Past Co-Director
- Micha Cárdenas
- Diana Deutsch
- Mark Dresser
- Ricardo Dominguez
- Matt Hope
- Natalie Jeremijenko
- George E. Lewis
- Lev Manovich
- Elle Mehrmand
- János_Négyesy
- Noah Wardrip-Fruin
