= Encyclopaedia Psychedelica =

English magazine

Encyclopaedia Psychedelica International was an independent London-based magazine in the late 1980s that mixed a return to hippie values combined with new emerging technology, at a time when to call someone a 'Hippie' was considered an insult. This publication may be considered a rallying point for those who were looking for a greater degree of spirituality-based themes in everyday life, and simultaneously a call to action for the early cyberpunk community in the UK and beyond. It was a stepping stone towards the group's public event production activities, which included a rave called Evolution in 1990, and the Megatripolis nightclub, which was a regular club night attended by David Bowie and other counterculture personalities of the era.

Contributors to the magazine included: Neil Oram, Charles Stephens, Timothy Leary, Ken Kesey, Pete Loveday, Tony Benn, Charles Bukowski, Robert Bly, Ysanne Spevack, and Richard Allen who went on to establish the neo-psychedelic Delerium Records label.

A poetry issue was guest edited by the poet and magician Stuart Nolan.

It was created in 1986 by the late Scotsman Fraser Clark who remained its editor through all 15 volumes which were actually produced. The intention of creating 100 volumes was never realised.

The publication advocated a new form of hippie, coining the terms - the "Zippie" - who would follow Timothy Leary in his modern philosophy of "Drop out, and drop in again" but using the internet and other emerging technologies of the late 1980s. In other words, embrace peace and love but also embrace technology and aspire towards the lifestyle that affords it.

This was later taken to America and beyond as the Pronoia tour.

The magazine was not connected to Mondo 2000 officially, but there was a non-official affiliation of values and ideas between the two publications, which resulted in personal connection between the two communities when the Pronoia tour went to the San Francisco Bay Area in the early 1990s.

In 1989 Fraser Clark and deputy editor Marcus Pennell organised the first Zippie Picnic on Hampstead Heath in London, which continues to this day.

Also in 1989, the EPi team were joined by northern graphic designers the Scooby Doobies who brought with them a love of rave culture. This led to the creation of Evolution magazine in 1990, and regular small underground parties which laid the way for the launch of the Megatripolis nightclub in 1993.
