= Megatripolis =

Former London club night

Coordinates: 51.5081°N 0.1240°W

Megatripolis was an underground London club-night created by Encyclopaedia Psychedelica/Evolution editor and founder of the Zippie movement Fraser Clark, partner Sionaidh Craigen, as well as a great many others. The club combined New Age ideology with Rave culture to create a vibrant, festival-like atmosphere presenting a wide variety of cross-cultural ideas and experiences. Club nights ran regularly on Thursdays from 1992 until 1995, being the focus of much of the Zippie movement. The club and its related activities such as the Sunday club for mothers and children and those interested in a more relaxed sharing of support, also helped to popularise ideas such as cyberculture and the Internet between those years.

== History and venues ==
The club first started at the Marquee Club in London when it was at 105 Charing Cross Road partly inspired by ideas and ideals coming out of the recession of the early nineties. Promoted by Sionaidh Craigen (Zana), Fraser Clark who had come up with the whole idea of the type of club he envisaged had take. The name from his novel..and some original evolution members and at first as a collaboration with Tribal Energy on Thursday nights in June 1993. The club hosted a lecture by Terence McKenna on its opening night with DJs Sequenci, Tribal Energy (Jez Turner), Solar Quest and Mixmaster Morris and featured an "ambient space" in the foyer and a "smart bar" on the terrace which sold various herbal drinks. With techno music playing, about 400 people attended.

The club ran weekly. After eight weeks, a disagreement between the Tribal Energy and Evolution crews led to a split. Tribal Energy then continued at the Marquee with a club on the same night, called 'Metropolis', which ran for seven weeks before closing. The Evolution crew consolidated and grew at the so-called Stansted Tree Party in September 1993 – a protest event to prevent woods near Stansted Airport in Essex being cleared to make way for housing development.

On 21 October 1993, the Heaven nightclub under Charing Cross railway station became home to the club. 2,000 people approximately attended for the free opening night but around 3,000 were turned away as police cordons were put up. Heaven was London's original gay-only nightclub, but had run non-gay (known as Pyramid) nights for many years, including clubs such as Rage, Earth, Spectrum and Land of Oz. The club had the distinction of being full or almost full for every night of its 155-week run at Heaven.

The Megatripolis 'Festival in a box' on Thursday nights attracted a diverse audience from a wide age range, many of whom would not otherwise have considered going clubbing. By early 1994, it had also taken over the adjoining Sound Shaft nightclub and turned it into an ambient space with frequent all-night sets by Mixmaster Morris on the club's fourth separate sound stage. The club had many DJs from across the broad spectrum of London's underground music scene. Megatripolis also promoted several large parties at Bagley's in Kings Cross and escalated its political agenda by renting an armoured car for the Criminal Justice and Public Order Bill protest rally in July 1994.

A three-CD album representing the club's music was released in July 1996 on Funky Peace Productions 2000 featuring mixes by DJ regulars and packaged in hemp (tree-free) paper. All production equipment owned by the club was distributed amongst its crew members. The rented premises under St.Pancras station were handed over to what was to become "Escape from Samsara", a club formed by some of the original Megatripolis crew which went on to run weekly Friday nights for 7 years at The Fridge in Brixton.

A Megatripolis event was also staged at the Hacienda in Manchester, and several times at The Rocket in North London with Energique.

== Culture and events ==
Megatripolis proved popular, although some reporting of it suggested a conflict between an avowed downplay of psychedelic drugs and an enthusiasm for substance use by some club-goers. In any event, the club provided a meeting place of like-minded people and served as a platform for social awareness and activism as well as more traditional nightclub fare. The club began on a commercial basis however became underground as it continued.

Typical evenings combined lectures and workshops with live musical performances accompanied by live video mixing and theatre. Musical styles were diverse, and included progressive house, trance, deep house, minimal techno and dub. The club played a seminal role in promoting trance music and was the birth-place of 'psy-trance'. Visits from speakers such as Allen Ginsberg, Terence McKenna, George Monbiot, Howard Marks and Ram Dass were common, part of Clark's 'parallel university' concept. Ginsberg's 1995 appearance on the club's 2nd birthday was made into the archive film Allen Ginsberg Live in London.

Guest DJs included James Monro, Colin Faver, Colin Dale, Alex Paterson, Andrew Weatherall, Mr. C, Tsuyoshi Suzuki, Youth and many others, but also featured sound system nights once a month when groups such as Flying Rhino, Zero Gravity, Liberator, Tripship, Sugarlump, Slack and others took over the main dance-floor. The club's resident DJs were Darius Akashic, Sequenci, Richard Grey, and Marco Arnaldi, at least one of them was on the main dance floor every week. Marcus Pennell was resident VJ. Atmospheric music combined with sound effects was played along to films in the "chill-out rooms" set apart from the dance floors.

New-age stalls occupied the central hallway selling non-alcoholic energy (or "smart") drinks, body jewellery, alternative "small press" comics and magazines (such as the short-lived, but influential Head Magazine), as well as T-shirts and other clothing. The club also encouraged face and body painters, massage therapists, healers and magicians.

Also notable were early demonstrations of the World Wide Web at a time when most patrons were just beginning to be aware of what was then termed cyberculture, something seen as an important, if not defining, part of the Zippie future. Underground bulletin boards such as London's pHreak hosted live "cyber events" from the club. In what was seen as very progressive at the time, a live video interview with Arthur C Clarke was conducted from his home in Sri Lanka on a portable satellite phone system (whose invention he was probably responsible for). Similarly, Timothy Leary was transmitted into the club via ISDN giving a live video interview from his home in the Los Angeles hills, ISDN having been installed at his house for the link. Leary had been banned from entering the UK in person by the British government in the 1960s, a ban that was still in force at the time. The Dalai Lama also gave a lecture at the club from the Barbican via ISDN on Thursday 18 July 1996. This link didn't work properly and was the final reason for the club's closure in October 1996.

Environmental issues were an important part of the club's remit and another part of the Zippie agenda. Anti-road protests were advertised on its internal noticeboards, hemp fashion shows were staged, environmental lectures and debates took place in the talk room called "The Well", and bicycle-powered sound-systems played on several occasions in various rooms. megatripolis was the key mover in climate change promotion at this time along with other UK environmental activists and the club was continued at Heaven nightclub after the crew split in early 1995 due to the continued importance of promoting environmental issues.

A UK tour took place in the spring / summer of 1996 including venues such as the Hacienda, Manchester, Junction, Cambridge, Zap Brighton and others. Two gigs were also held at the Mad club in Athens, Greece in 1996.

== Megatripolis West ==
An offshoot of the club was started by Fraser Clark and others, in San Francisco in late 1994. It ran for five consecutive weeks before closing.

The sixth and final night of the club was a "launch rave" hosted by Ronin Publishing for Timothy Leary's book Chaos And Cyber Culture. In true "illegal UK rave" tradition, patrons were given the event's location at a nearby burger joint. Leary jammed and performed jazz skat with famous Bay Area musician Maruga. He was later kidnapped by the Zippie Soundsystem and forced to release a statement condemning the UK Prime Minister John Major and the Criminal Justice and Public Order Act 1994, which famously banned outdoor parties with music that included an "emission of a succession of repetitive beats".

Leary exerted a powerful influence over the philosophy of the club and the Zippie movement overall. An indication of this can be found in the introduction to his posthumous book The Fugitive Philosopher (Ronin Press, September 2007) written by Fraser Clark. The original title of the piece, published in Clark's online magazine the UP!

== Megatripolis in popular culture ==
Megatripolis is referenced in the BBC TV comedy 'Absolutely Fabulous' and on the Red Hot Chili Peppers album 'Stadium Arcadium'. The club helped to play a major part in creating 'Cool Britannia' the UK's culture boom in the 90's and started the UK's major festival scene which continues to this day, 25 years after the club's close. Well-known people who attended the club as visitors included Malcolm McLaren, Lynne Franks, The Pet Shop Boys, Björk, Heather Small, and Richard Branson.

== Megatripolis Reunion Benefit for Fraser Clark ==
In 2008 Fraser Clark announced that he had inoperable liver cancer. In farewell to him, a final Megatripolis was held at Heaven on 13 November. He died on 21 January 2009.

== See also ==
- List of electronic dance music venues
