= Zippie =

1972 American breakaway Yippie faction

Zippie was briefly the name of the breakaway Yippie faction that demonstrated at the 1972 Republican and Democratic Conventions in Miami Beach, Florida. The origin of the word is an evolution of the term Yippie, which was coined by the Youth International Party in the 1960s. After these events, "the Zippies evolved back into Yippies", but the word Zippie remained, used by record labels, rock bands, and assorted others.

In subsequent years, zippie has arisen in reference to 1990s technopeople, in contradiction to yuppies. In the 1990s, Fraser Clark and others created a unique subculture that combined the "1990s techno hemisphere with the 1960s earth person". Thus, Zippies were advocates of PLUR (Peace Love Unity Respect), which originated on the alt.raves and alt.culture.zippies usenet groups.

== 1972 ==
Yippie (YIP) was an acronym for "Youth International Party"; similarly, Zippie (ZIP) was an acronym for "Zeitgeist International Party"—a term coined by underground journalist and cannabis rights activist Tom Forcade. This was the name given to the radical breakaway Yippie faction that demonstrated at the 1972 Republican and Democratic Conventions in Miami Beach.

Zippies became prominent internationally during the American 1972 Democratic National Convention and 1972 Republican National Convention, held in Miami Beach, Florida, USA, when the word was silk-screened on t-shirts and worn by counter-culture activists and groups working to end US involvement in the Vietnam War.

== 1994 ==
In May 1994 Wired magazine published an article titled "Here Come the Zippies!". The cover of the magazine featured a kaleidoscopic image of a smiling young man with wild hair, a funny hat, and mechanical eyeglasses. Written by Jules Marshall, the article announced an organized cultural response to Thatcherism in the British Isles.

There's a new and rapidly spreading cultural virus ripping through the British Isles. The symptoms of those infected include attacks of optimism, strong feelings of community, and lowered stress levels. Will their gathering in August at the Grand Canyon be the Woodstock of the '90s?

The article describes zippies, according to 50-year-old Fraser Clark, as "Zen-Inspired Pronoia Professional", or "hippies with zip." The UK media tried to pin various labels on the Y Generation such as "cyber-crusties", "techno-hippies", and "post-ravers." Fraser Clark espoused a philosophy known as pronoia and embarked on an expedition to the United States. This tour was dubbed the Zippy Pronoia Tour to US.

Other uses of the term are "Zen Inspired Peace Professional." These zippies were a New Age kind of hippie who embraced Chaos Theory, Blakean revolt, modern mysteries such as New Age Paganism, trance music, rave culture, smart drinks, free software, technology and entrepreneurism in an effort to bring about a better world.

A group called "The Zippies" were behind one of the first acts of electronic civil disobedience with a collective online action against the 1994 Criminal Justice Bill.

== 2004 ==
In his book The World Is Flat, Thomas L. Friedman describe zippies as a "huge cohort of Indian youth who are first to come of the age since India shifted away from socialism and dived headfirst into global trade and information revolution by turning itself into world's service center".

The original source of the 2004 term "Zippies" comes from an Indian English-language weekly magazine called Outlook in an article called Age Of The Zippie.

== See also ==
- Hippie
- Yippie
- Counterculture
- Electrohippies
- Rave
- Subculture
- Free Culture
