= Electronic civil disobedience =

Form of nonviolent online protest

Electronic civil disobedience (ECD; also known as cyber civil disobedience or cyber disobedience) can refer to any type of civil disobedience in which the participants use information technology to carry out their actions. Electronic civil disobedience often involves computers and the Internet and may also be known as hacktivism. Critical Art Ensemble (CAE), a collective of tactical media artists and practitioners, created "electronic civil disobedience" in the critical writings of their seminal 1996 text, Electronic Civil Disobedience: And Other Unpopular Ideas. Electronic civil disobedience seeks to continue the practices of nonviolent-yet-disruptive protest originally pioneered by American poet Henry David Thoreau, who in 1848 published Civil Disobedience.

Virtual sit-ins may be announced on the internet by hacktivist groups like the borderlands Hacklab.

Stefan Wray writes about ECD:

"As hackers become politicized and as activists become computerized, we are going to see an increase in the number of cyber-activists who engage in what will become more widely known as Electronic Civil Disobedience. The same principals of traditional civil disobedience, like trespass and blockage, will still be applied, but more and more these acts will take place in electronic or digital form. The primary site for Electronic Civil Disobedience will be in cyberspace.

Jeff Shantz and Jordon Tomblin write that ECD or cyber disobedience merges activism with organization and movement building through online participatory engagement:

Cyber disobedience emphasizes direct action, rather than protest, appeals to authority, or simply registering dissent, which directly impedes the capacities of economic and political elites to plan, pursue, or carry out activities that would harm non-elites or restrict the freedoms of people in non-elite communities. Cyber disobedience, unlike much of conventional activism or even civil disobedience, does not restrict actions on the basis of state or corporate acceptance or legitimacy or in terms of legality (which cyber disobedient view largely as biased, corrupt, mechanisms of elites rule). In many cases recently, people and groups involved in online activism or cyber disobedience are also involving themselves in real world actions and organizing. In other cases people and groups who have only been involved in real world efforts are now moving their activism and organizing online as well.

== History ==
In the 1980s, this type of activism began. The Critical Art Ensemble created "electronic civil disobedience".

Some commentators pinpointing the 1997 Acteal Massacre in Chiapas, Mexico, as a turning point. In reaction to the Acteal Massacre, the Electronic Disturbance Theatre (not associated with Autonomedia) released FloodNet. Electrohippies flooded the World Trade Organization site during the World Trade Organization Ministerial Conference of 1999 protest activity.

== Hacktivism ==
The term electronic civil disobedience and hacktivism may be used synonymously. Some commentators maintain that ECD uses only legal means, as opposed to illegal actions used by hacktivists. In reality the distinction between ECD and hacktivism is not clear.

Ricardo Dominguez of the Electronic Disturbance Theater has been incorrectly referred to by many as a founder of ECD and hacktivism. He is currently an Assistant Professor of Visual Arts at the University of California, San Diego and teaches classes on Electronic Civil Disobedience and Performance Art. His recent project the Transborder Immigrant Tool is a hacktivist gesture which has received wide media attention and criticism from anti-immigration groups.

== Examples ==
ECD is often open-source and non-structured.

Electronic civil disobedience generally involves large numbers of people and may use legal and illegal techniques. For example, a single person reloading a website repeatedly is not illegal, but if enough people do it at the same time it can render the website inaccessible. Another type of electronic civil disobedience is the use of the Internet for publicized and deliberate violations of a law that the protesters take issue with, such as copyright law.

Blatant disregard of copyright law by millions of Internet users every day on file sharing networks might also be considered a form of constant ECD, as the people doing it have decided to simply ignore a law that they disagree with.

Blockchain technology has been leveraged by EDC groups to help make them more decentralized, anonymous, and secure.

=== Intervasion of the UK ===
In order to draw attention to John Major's Criminal Justice Bill, a group of cyber-activists staged an event in which they "kidnapped" 60s counter-cultural hero Timothy Leary at a book launch for Chaos & Cyberculture held on Guy Fawkes Day 1994, and then proceeded to "force him to DDoS government websites". Leary called the event an "Intervasion". The Intervasion was preceded by mass email-bombing and denial of service attacks against government servers with some success. Although ignored by the mainstream media, the event was reported on Free Radio Berkeley.

=== Grey Tuesday ===
On February 24, 2004, large scale intentional copyright infringement occurred in an event called Grey Tuesday, "a day of coordinated civil disobedience". Activists intentionally violated EMI's copyright of The White Album by distributing MP3 files of The Grey Album, a mashup of The White Album with The Black Album, in an attempt to draw public attention to copyright reform issues and anti-copyright ideals. Jonathan Zittrain, professor of Internet law at Harvard Law School, comments that "As a matter of pure legal doctrine, the Grey Tuesday protest is breaking the law, end of story. But copyright law was written with a particular form of industry in mind. The flourishing of information technology gives amateurs and homerecording artists powerful tools to build and share interesting, transformative, and socially valuable art drawn from pieces of popular cultures. There's no place to plug such an important cultural sea change into the current legal regime."

=== Border Haunt ===
On July 15, 2011, 667 people from 28 different countries participated in the online collective act of electronic civil disobedience called "Border Haunt" that targeted the policing of the U.S.-Mexico border. Participants collected entries from a database maintained by the Arizona Daily Star that holds the names and descriptions of migrants that died trying to cross the border territory and then sent those entries into a database run by the company BlueServo which is used to surveil and police the border. As a result, the border was conceptually and symbolically haunted for the duration of the one-day action as the border policing structure received over 1,000 reports of deceased migrants attempting to cross the border. The Border Haunt action was organized by Ian Alan Paul, a California-based new media artist and was reported on by Al Jazeera English and the Bay Citizen.

=== E-Graffiti: Texts in Mourning and Action ===
In response to the political assassination of Zapatista teacher Jose Luis Solís López (alias Galeano), in Chiapas, Mexico, Ian Alan Paul and Ricardo Dominguez developed a new form of Electronic Civil Disobedience that was used as part of a distributed online performance on May 24, 2014 as part of the week of action and day of remembrance in solidarity with the Zapatista communities.

When users logged on to the project website, their web browsers sent mass amounts of page requests to the server of the Mexican President Enrique Peña Nieto, filling their error logs with lines of text drawn from Don Quixote, communiques from the Zapatista Communities, as well as from texts authored by the Critical Art Ensemble. As a kind of E-Graffiti and form of Electronic Civil Disobedience, floods of HTTP traffic were sent from around the world as the books and communiques were written onto the error logs of their servers several thousand times by different users.

=== Öppna skolplattformen ===
In 2020 a Swedish citizen initiative to build an app for accessing the data from the City of Stockholm’s official school system began. The background is that the City of Stockholm had developed an official school system in-house. The result was a very expensive system (more than $117 million). The mobile application for parents and employees to use left user frustrated and complaining about complexity and horrible usability. As a result of this some parents decided to build an open source version mobile alternative using the API of the school platform. On February 12, 2021 the app was released and all of its code was published under an open source license on GitHub. Following this the city began to work against the new alternative citizen made frontend and tried blocking it by obfuscating the official web application's API-calls, reporting key people in the citizen project to the police, calling them out in the press as unlawful, etc.

During most of 2021 the city counsel and staff upheld their opposition but saw their costs rising and that there was an overwhelming support of the new frontend. The politicians in charge finally chose to step in in the fall of 2021 and open up a collaboration with the parents building the frontend.

=== Thai Censorship ===
When the government of Thailand proposed a system to reform their country's network in 2015. They stated that changes were imperative "to control the inappropriate websites and control the inflow of information." Their proposed reform would allow the government to monitor and censor the circulation of their network. A couple of months before this news, the Thai government underwent a coup which also resulted in the new government taking over major media and banning political gatherings. These serious events concerned the people of Thailand which caused them to organize and act.

Rather than participating in a DDOS attack against the government which is usually associated with criminal activity, they decided to take to Facebook to gather internet users from around the world. These users all occupied Thai government websites in order to overflow their bandwidth and called it a "Virtual sit-in." The daily average users increased by almost 100,000 people which then prompted the government to announce that they would not use their reform proposal to censor but to study the youth.

== See also ==
- Anonymous (group)
- E-democracy
- Digital rights
- Direct action
- Ricardo Dominguez (professor)
- Information freedom
- Internet vigilantism
