= Intervasion of the UK =

The Intervasion of the UK was a 1994 electronic civil disobedience and collective action against the 1994 Criminal Justice Bill which sought to outlaw outdoor festivals involving electronic dance music. Launched by a group called The Zippies from San Francisco's 181 Club on Guy Fawkes Day, 5th November 1994, it resulted in government websites going down for at least a week. It utilised a form of distributed denial of service (DDoS) known as the email bomb in order to overload servers as a form of online protest and internet activism. It was the first such use of the internet and technology as a weapon of struggle and/or civil disobedience, and preceded the 1995 Italian virtual sit-in or "netstrike".

== Campaign against the CJB ==
Under the Criminal Justice and Public Order Act of 1994, the definition of music played at a rave was given as "sounds wholly or predominantly characterised by the emission of a succession of repetitive beats".

Sections 63, 64 & 65 of the Act targeted electronic dance music played at raves. The Act empowered police to stop a rave in the open air when "ten or more people are attending, or where two or more are making preparations for a rave". Section 65 allowed any uniformed constable who believes a person is on their way to a rave within a 5-mile (8.0 km) radius to stop them and direct them away from the area; "non-compliant citizens may be subject to a maximum fine not exceeding level 3 on the standard scale (£1000)".

The Zippies sought to jam the mailboxes of UK politicians associated with the Bill in order to bring their attention to the issue of natural justice involving basic rights and freedoms. In effect, the collective action was saying: "If you take away our freedom, we have the power to take away something you take for granted, and to do this in a way which deploys the Internet as a weapon".

Several hackers not directly associated with the group launched all-out penetration testing and load testing operations against several UK government websites, resulting in a tit-for-tat battle, as the Zippies mailbox on morph.com went down, along with the entire server of Morph, a well-known Bay Area BBS.

== Media coverage ==
The event was broadcast on Radio Free Berkeley.

The protest action occurred during the manhunt for Kevin Mitnick and was thus partly an underground event. The media also refused to entertain the implications of electronic civil disobedience, with public attention focused on the problem of illegal raves and black-hat hackers, prompting scare stories about "evil hackers" and "young hoodlums" penetrating the British defences while the zippies were written off as nothing more than electrohippies.

== Criticism ==
Some criticism of the Intervasion was expressed by the Electronic Frontier Foundation who complained about the "lack of a cutoff date". Other criticism on the Whole Earth 'Lectronic Link (WELL) BBS centered on the use of militant language. The online protest action also suffered from conflict between its stated aims: "To clog the servers of the UK government", and its call to send email messages to UK politicians. Thus jamming mailboxes with email and large file attachments defeated the purpose of the exercise which was essentially an early form of hacktivism. The nature of the collective action was also not articulated well enough. For instance, the digital be-in which occurred during the launch of Timothy Leary's Chaos and Cyberculture, in which Leary was "kidnapped" without the consent of his publisher, and "forced" to DDoS the UK government, was simply a protest message, sent repeatedly to mailboxes around the world.

== Tools ==
- Distributed denial of service
- Email bomb
- UUCP
- VT100 terminal emulator
- PowerBook 180
- Ping of death

== See also ==
- Culture jamming
- Electronic civil disobedience
- Electrohippies
- Hacktivism
- Reality hacking
- Internet activism
