= Fembot (disambiguation) =

A fembot is an android specifically gendered feminine.

Fembot or Fembots may refer to:

== Music ==
- Fembots (band), a Canadian indie rock band
- "Fembot" (song), a song by Robyn
- "Fembot in a Wet T-Shirt", a song from the album Joe's Garage by Frank Zappa

== Other uses ==
- Fembot Collective, an international collective of feminist media activists, artists, producers, and scholars
- Fembots (Austin Powers), fictional characters in the Austin Powers film series
- "Femmebot", a track by Charli XCX from Pop 2
