= Pronoia (disambiguation) =

Pronoia may refer to:

- Pronoia (plural pronoiai, Greek for "provisions"), a system of land grants in the Byzantine Empire
- Pronoia (psychology), the phenomenon akin to the opposite of paranoia
- The Greek term for providence (usually Divine Providence) in ancient Greek philosophy
- The mother of Deucalion according to some sources
