= CRCA =

CRCA may refer to:

- Cataraqui Region Conservation Authority, Ontario, Canada
- Center for Research in Computing and the Arts
- Century Road Club Association
- Christian Reformed Churches of Australia
- University of Puerto Rico at Carolina (formerly known as Colegio Regional de Carolina)
- Cooperative Research Centre Association
- Copyright Remedy Clarification Act
- Canadian Alliance (Canadian Reform Conservative Alliance)
- Regional Insurance Control Commission
