= Texas Virtual Border Watch =

The Texas Virtual Border Watch is a pilot program created by the State of Texas that allows individuals with internet access to observe and report on the Texas–Mexico border via their computers. On June 1, 2006, Texas Governor Rick Perry announced 5 million dollars to be used with the voluntary participation of private land owners to install the cameras.

The trial version of the Texas Virtual Border Watch received 2,780 reports of suspicious activity before November 2008. The site has attracted participation from individuals around the world, including Australian pub patrons. Users range from those who want to help stop illegal drug traffic and illegal immigration across the border to those simply looking for "something to do".

From November 2008 to February 2009, the program has been credited for four busts yielding 1,500 pounds of marijuana, and 30 incidents where illegal immigrants were repelled.

It is funded by the Texas governor's criminal justice office, at a cost of $2 million in its first year. The Texas Border Sheriff's Coalition (TBSC) instituted the program with BlueServo Inc. to provide the free service.

== See also ==
- Illegal drug trade
- Homeland security
