= Waisman =

Waisman is a surname that may refer to:

- David Waisman (b. 1937), Peruvian politician
- Marina Waisman (1920–1997), Argentine architect and writer
- Nina Waisman, American new media artist

See also:

- Friedrich Waismann, Austrian-British philosopher
