= Micha Cárdenas =

American artist and author (born 1977)

- Born: 1977 (age 48–49)
- Education: University of California, San Diego
- Awards: 2022 NWSA Gloria E. Anzaldúa Book Prize; 2020 IndieCade Impact Award

Micha Cárdenas, stylized as micha cárdenas, is an American visual and performance artist who is an associate professor of Critical Race & Ethnic Studies and Performance, Play & Design at the University of California, Santa Cruz. Cárdenas' artistic and theoretical focus is on the algorithms and poetics of trans people of color in digital media.

== Artwork and performances ==
Cárdenas has presented her work around the world, including performances at the 2015 Association of Internet ResearchersConference, 2014 Digital Gender workshop at Umeå University in Sweden, 2013 Dark Side of the Digital conference, 2012 Allied Media Conference, 2012 ZERO1 Biennial Street Festival in San Jose, 2009 Hemispheric Institute of Performance and Politics Encuentro in Bogotá, Colombia, 2010 Orange County Museum of Art California Biennial, and 2009 Arte Nuevo InteractivA Mérida Biennial. In 2008, cárdenas performed Becoming Dragon, a 365-hour mixed reality performance in Second Life. Other projects include "Unstoppable", a collaboration with Patrisse Cullors, Chris Head, and Edxie Betts to create no-cost bulletproofclothing; Local Autonomy Networks; and "Virus Circus" (a collaboration with Elle Mehrmand). She has curated exhibits in Los Angeles, New York City, and Tijuana. Cárdenas' work Sin Sol, Forest Memory (2018) created in collaboration with Abraham Avnisan, was included in the group exhibition “Between Bodies,” curated by Nina Bozicnik, at the Henry Art Gallery from October 27, 2018 to April 28, 2019. It was reviewed in Art in America and The Seattle Times.

As a member of the Electronic Disturbance Theater and b.a.n.g. lab, cárdenas helped design the Transborder Immigrant Tool, a GPS device designed to guide immigrants crossing the Mexico–United States border and to help them find water stations during their journey. Critics claimed that the project was an irresponsible use of government funds and would assist illegal activity. Cárdenas stated that the aim of this project was "about giving water to somebody who's dying in the desert of dehydration." Ultimately, all investigations of the project were dropped without finding any misuse of funds or illegal activity on the part of the artists.

== Writings ==
=== Books ===
Cárdenas's first book, co-authored with Barbara Fornssler in 2010, Trans Desire / Affective Cyborgs, discusses an experimental conception of politics based in desire.

In 2012, Cárdenas co-authored The Transreal: Political Aesthetics of Crossing Realities, co-edited by Zach Blas and Wolfgang Schirmacher, which was published by Atropos Press. The book discusses art, games, and activism that use multiple realities, including augmented reality, mixed reality, and alternate reality approaches.

Cárdenas' monograph Poetic Operations: Trans of Color Art in Digital Media was published by Duke University Press in 2022.

=== Essays and articles ===
In 2013, cárdenas's poetry and a statement on poetics was published in the anthology Troubling the Line by Nightboat Books. The editors describe the book as the first anthology of transgender and genderqueer poetry. In 2014, cárdenas contributed an essay titled "Movements of Safety" to the book Plants, Androids and Operators: A Post-Media Handbook by Mute Publishing. The book includes essays from theorists and artists working in the Post-Media Lab at Leuphana University. In December, 2017, MIT Press published Trap Door: Trans Cultural Production and the Politics of Visibility, which contains cárdenas's chapter "Dark Shimmers: The Rhythm of Necropolitical Affect in Digital Media". In this work, she discusses "a few moments of time in the months of June and July 2016, during which extreme violence against trans, black, and Latinx people occurred repeatedly, rhythmically."

Cárdenas has published several works related to the theoretical issues raised in her performances, including "Becoming Dragon, A Transversal Technology Study" in the 2013 book Critical Digital Studies from University of Toronto Press, and "I Am Transreal" in the 2010 book Gender Outlaws: The Next Generation, edited by Kate Bornstein and S. Bear Bergman.

In 2015, her article "Shifting Futures: Digital Trans of Color Praxis" was published in Ada: A Journal of Gender, New Media, and Technology. Her works "Redshift and Portalmetal", "Pregnancy: Reproductive Futures in Trans of Color Feminism", "QueerOS: A User’s Manual", and "Trans of Color Poetics: Stitching Bodies, Concepts, and Algorithms" were published in 2016. Additional published works include the 2010 essay "Technesexual Interface: Erotic Mixed Reality Performance", co-authored with Elle Mehrmand. "Monstrous Children of Pregnant Androids: Latinx Futures after Orlando" was published in GLQ in January 2018.

== Awards ==
In 2020, cárdenas's augmented reality artwork Sin Sol / No Sun won the Impact Award at the IndieCade independent game festival.

In 2022, cárdenas's book Poetic Operations: Trans of Color Art in Digital Media was the co-winner of the Gloria E. Anzaldúa Book Prize from the National Women's Studies Association.

== Teaching and research ==
Previously, cárdenas was assistant professor of interactive media design and interdisciplinary arts & sciences at the University of Washington Bothell. Cárdenas was also a lecturer in the visual arts department and gender studies program at University of California, San Diego. She was previously the Interim Associate Director of Art and Technology at UCSD and a researcher at the Center for Research in Computing and the Arts, California Institute for Telecommunications and Information Technology, and UC San Diego School of Medicine. Cárdenas worked on the Scalable City project in the Experimental Game Lab at the Center for Research in Computing and the Arts.

== Education ==
Cárdenas earned her PhD at the University of Southern California in the Media Arts and Practice division, where she was a Provost's Fellow. She received her MFA at the University of California, San Diego in the summer of 2009. She also holds a master's degree in communications from the European Graduate School and a bachelor's degree in computer science from Florida International University.
