= Domains by Proxy =

Internet company offering domain privacy services

Domains by Proxy, LLC (DBP) is an Internet company started by the founder of GoDaddy, Bob Parsons. Domains by Proxy offers domain privacy services through partner domain registrars such as GoDaddy and Wild West Domains.

Subscribers list Domains by Proxy as their administrative and technical contacts in the Internet's WHOIS database, thereby delegating responsibility for managing unsolicited contacts from third parties and keeping the domains owners' personal information secret. However, the company will release a registrant's personal information in some cases, such as by court order or for other reasons as deemed appropriate by the company per its Domain Name Proxy Agreement.

As of 2014, over 9,850,000 domain names use the Domains by Proxy service.

== Political usage ==
In the run-up to the 2012 United States presidential primaries, numerous domain names with derogatory expressions have been registered through Domains by Proxy by both Republicans and Democrats.

Domains by Proxy have allegedly been a target of the Internet organization Anonymous due to perceived malicious business activities including inducements to join their service, claims of privacy that are not fulfilled and the lowering of Google PageRank of the sites they link to.

== Controversy ==
=== Fraudsters and scam ===
Controversially, Domains By Proxy is also used by a number of organizations that target vulnerable individuals by sending threatening psychic letters, and fake drug companies. It is also used by fake anti-spyware and anti-malware sites to hide their real ownership of the software that they promote.

Advance Fee fraudsters also use Domains By Proxy. On 5 February 2016, the database of Artists Against 419, an Internet consumer protection group, reflected 1124 out of 108684 entries abused the services of Domains By Proxy. This represents a figure of slightly over one percent of the entries.

Reportedly, Domains By Proxy provides services to various scammers around the world.

It also was alleged that it scams domain owners for $50 USD when a third party sends emails to DBP claiming legal matters.

=== Privacy ===
In 2014, Domains by Proxy handed over personal details of a site owner to the Motion Picture Association due to potential copyright infringement despite the website not hosting any copyrighted files.

== See also ==
- Internet privacy
