= Fraser Clark =

Fraser Clark (died 21 January 2009), was one of the leaders of the global technogaian movement. As founder and editor of Encyclopaedia Psychedelica, he outlined his views on entheogens and nature, and was a key advocate of the outdoor rave movement, hosting regular, small, indoor festivals such as those held at his central London club, Megatripolis.

Clark believed the 1990s were the 1960s upside-down (9 being an upside-down 6). He advocated a new form of hippie—the "Zippie"—who would balance the "techno right brain" with the "hippy left brain", embracing nature, peace and love, as well as technology. In 1989, he and Marcus Pennell organised the first Zippie Picnic on Hampstead Heath in London. Zippie Picnics continue to this day.

Clark staged many pranks, particularly against the government of Margaret Thatcher and then John Major. He opposed the Poll Tax and later Criminal Justice Bill.

Clark also engaged American youth culture on topics related to the Pronoia tour.

In 2008, he announced he had inoperable liver cancer.
