= Carol Stabile =

American academic

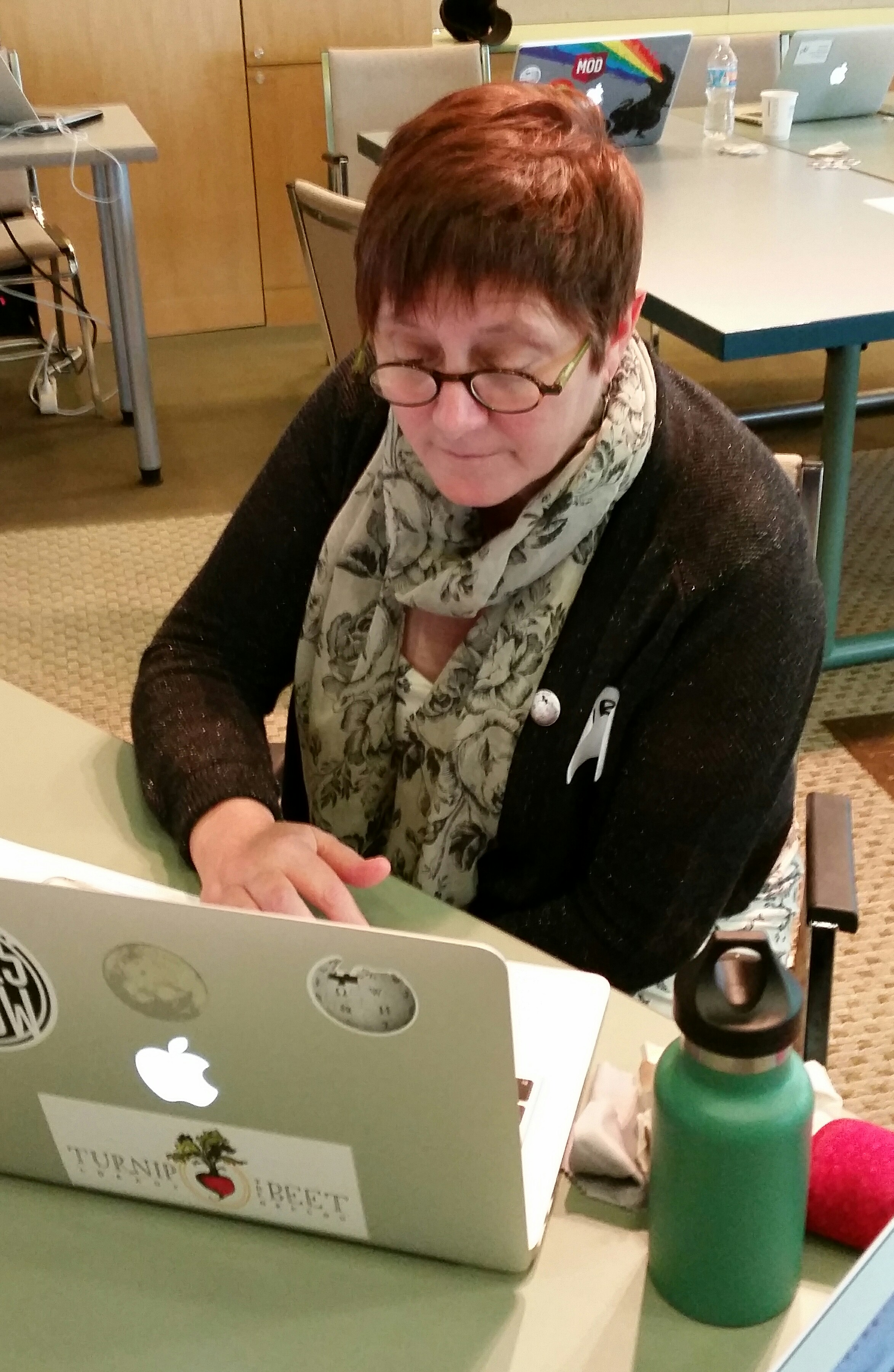
- Born: 1960 (age 65–66)
- Awards: American Council of Learned Societies fellowship

Academic background
- Education: Mount Holyoke College, Brown University

Academic work
- Discipline: Journalism and Communication
- Sub-discipline: Women’s and Gender Studies
- Institutions: University of Maryland, College Park
- Notable works: Feminism and the Technological Fix; White Victims, Black Villains: Gender, Race, and Crime News in US Culture
- Notable ideas: Task Force to Protect Students from Sexual Violence

Carol Stabile is a professor in the department of Women's Studies at the University of Maryland, College Park.

In 2014, Stabile received an American Council of Learned Societies fellowship for her work on blacklisted (supposedly communist) and conservative women's involvement in 1940s and 1950s television industries. Her project "examines the forms of employment progressive women were seeking in the new industry, as well as the opposition they faced from anti-communist men and women opposed to viewpoints they considered un-American." Prior to the ACLS fellowship, Stabile's peer-reviewed academic article "The Typhoid Marys of the Left: Gender, Race, and the Broadcast Blacklist" received the 2013 Ronald D. and Gayla T. Farrar Award in Media and Civil Rights History.

== Education ==
Stabile received a Bachelor of Arts from Mount Holyoke College, and a PhD in English from Brown University in 1992. She then took a Postdoctoral Research Fellowship in the Unit for Criticism and Interpretive theory at the University of Illinois Institute of Communications Research. During her PhD she researched gender, technology, and feminist theory, and published her most widely cited article "Shooting the Mother: Fetal Photography and the Politics of Disappearance." She is now a professor and chair of Women's Studies at the University of Maryland, College Park, where her research focuses on the intersections of gender, race, class, and sexual orientation in media and popular culture.

== Contributions ==
Stabile has published several books in the field of feminism including Feminism and the Technological Fix and White Victims, Black Villains: Gender, Race, and Crime News in US Culture. Additionally, she serves on the Ms. Magazine Committee of Scholars, and is an adviser and co-founder of Fembot Collective. In 2018, she published The Broadcast 41: Women and the Anti-Communist Blacklist detailing the era when the FBI lead an anti-communist crusade against progressive voices, especially women voices, in broadcasting.

Beyond her work in feminist theory, Stabile also became a media figure as the Chair of the University of Oregon's Task Force to Protect Students from Sexual Violence and a leader of the UO Coalition to End Sexual Violence. Propelled by the work of the New Campus Anti-Rape Movement, the committee's most prominent proposals included suspending the university's plans to expand Greek life, and forming a new office to centralize the University of Oregon's responses to and prevention of sexual violence.
