= AARON =

Computer program generating artistic images

AARON is the collective name for a series of computer programs written by artist Harold Cohen that create original artistic images autonomously, which set it apart from previous programs.

Proceeding from Cohen's initial question "What are the minimum conditions under which a set of marks functions as an image?", AARON was in development between 1972 and the 2010s. As the software is not open source, its development effectively ended with Cohen's death in 2016. The name "AARON" does not seem to be an acronym; rather, it was a name chosen to start with the letter "A" so that the names of successive programs could follow it alphabetically. However, Cohen did not create any other major programs.

Initial versions of AARON created abstract drawings that grew more complex through the 1970s. More representational imagery was added in the 1980s; first rocks, then plants, then people. In the 1990s more representational figures set in interior scenes were added, along with color. AARON returned to more abstract imagery, this time in color, in the early 2000s.

Cohen used machines that allowed AARON to produce physical artwork. The first machines drew in black and white using a succession of custom-built "turtle" and flatbed plotter devices. Cohen would sometimes color these images by hand in fabric dye (Procion), or scale them up to make larger paintings and murals. In the 1990s Cohen built a series of digital painting machines to output AARON's images in ink and fabric dye. His later work used a large-scale inkjet printer on canvas.

Development of AARON began in the C programming language then switched to Lisp in the early 1990s. Cohen credited Lisp with helping him solve the challenges he faced in adding color capabilities to AARON.

An article about Cohen appeared in Computer Answers that describes AARON and shows two line drawings that were exhibited at the Tate gallery. The article goes on to describe the workings of AARON, then running on a DEC VAX 750 minicomputer.

Raymond Kurzweil's company produced a downloadable screensaver of AARON for Microsoft Windows PCs. This version of AARON can also produce printable images. AARON's source code is not publicly available, but Cohen described AARON's operations in various essays and it is discussed in abstract in Pamela McCorduck's book.

AARON cannot learn new styles or imagery on its own; each new capability had to be hand-coded by Cohen. It is capable of producing a practically infinite supply of distinct images in its own style. Examples of these images have been exhibited in galleries worldwide. AARON's artwork has been used as an artistic equivalent of the Turing test. It does seem however that AARON's output follows a noticeable formula (figures standing next to a potted plant, framed within a colored square is a common theme).

Cohen was very careful not to claim that AARON is creative. But he did ask "If what AARON is making is not art, what is it exactly, and in what ways, other than its origin, does it differ from the 'real thing?' If it is not thinking, what exactly is it doing?" — The further exploits of AARON, Painter.

The Whitney Museum featured AARON in 2024, showcasing the evolution of AARON as the earliest artificial intelligence (AI) program for artmaking.
