= Harold Cohen (artist) =

British-born American-based artist

- Cohen in 1979
- Born: 1 May 1928; London, UK
- Died: 27 April 2016 (aged 87)
- Occupation: artist
- Organization: University of California, San Diego
- Known for: AARON

Harold Cohen (1 May 1928 – 27 April 2016) was a British-born artist who was noted as the creator of AARON, a computer program designed to produce paintings and drawings autonomously, which set it apart from previous programs. His work in the intersection of computer artificial intelligence and painting led to exhibitions at many museums, including the Tate Gallery in London.

== Early life ==
Cohen was born in London, the son of Polish-Russian Jewish parents, and was educated there at the Slade School of Fine Art.

== Career ==
Cohen represented Great Britain at the Venice Biennial in 1966. Cohen moved to the United States as a visiting lecturer at the University of California, San Diego in 1968. He was later given the rank of professor and stayed at UC San Diego for nearly three decades; part of the time as chairman of the Visual Arts Department.

In addition, he served as director of the Center for Research in Computing and the Arts at UC San Diego from 1992 to 1998.

Cohen taught at UC San Diego from 1968 to 1994. After his retirement from UCSD, he continued to work on AARON and produce new artwork in his studio in Encinitas, California.

In 2014, Cohen received the ACM SIGGRAPH Distinguished Artist Award for Lifetime Achievement award.

Early in 2016, Cohen started a new project with AARON called Fingerpainting for the 21st Century. In this project, Cohen used a touch screen to digitally colour and finish artworks. In previous AARON projects, images would be outputted in physical form before Cohen made alterations.

== Family life ==
His partner was the prominent Japanese poet Hiromi Itō.

== AARON ==
Cohen's work on AARON began in 1968 at the University of California, San Diego. He initially wrote AARON in the C programming language but eventually converted to Lisp, citing that C was "too inflexible, too inexpressive, to deal with something as conceptually complex as color."
