= Zippy Pronoia Tour =

In 1994, John Battelle, co-founding editor of Wired Magazine, commissioned Jules Marshall to write a piece on the Zippies. The cover story broke records for being one of the most publicized stories of the year and was used to promote Wired's HotWired news service.

The people involved with this positive media virus rode a massive wave until they were knocked off that wave by powerful interests. The web archive of the Zippy Pronoia Tour to US represents one of the first cyberculture destinations on the web.

== See also ==
- Zippies
- Rave
- Wired Magazine
