= Electronic Disturbance Theater =

Artist collective

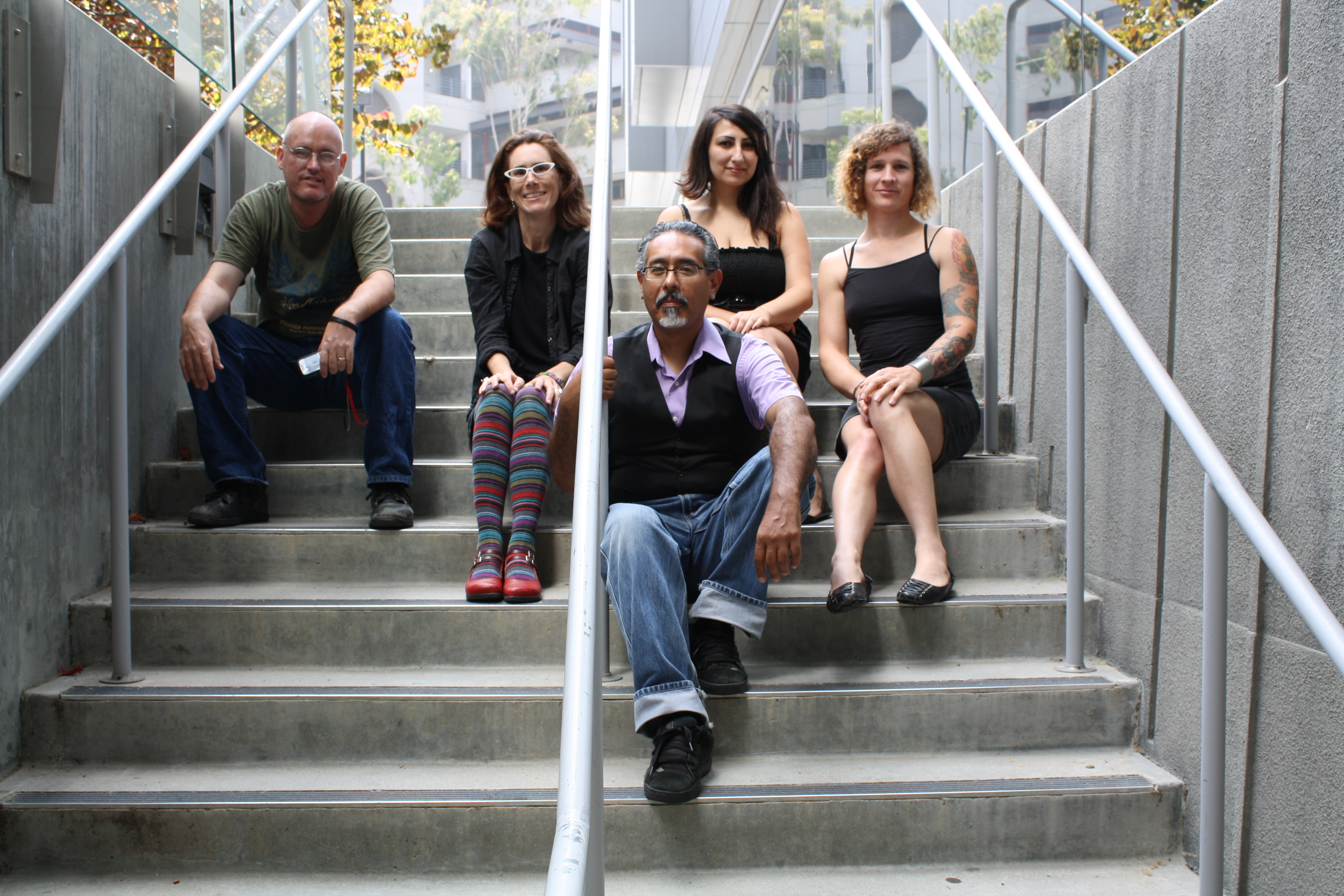
Electronic Disturbance Theater 2.0

The Electronic Disturbance Theater (EDT), established in 1997 by performance artist and writer Ricardo Dominguez, is an electronic company of cyber activists, critical theorists, and performance artists.

== History ==
The Electronic Disturbance Theater was founded in 1997 by Ricardo Dominguez, Brett Stalbaum, Stefan Wray and Carmin Karasic. Taking the idea of the American Civil Rights Movement of the 1960s, the EDT members used their real names. As a collective, they organized and programmed computer software to show their views against anti-propagandist and military actions, mobilizing micronetworks to act in solidarity by staging virtual sit-ins online and allowing the emergence of a collective presence in direct digital actions.

A second iteration of the group, called Electronic Disturbance Theater 2.0, included Brett Stalbaum, Amy Sara Carroll, Elle Mehrmand, Micha Cárdenas, and Ricardo Dominguez.

== FloodNet ==
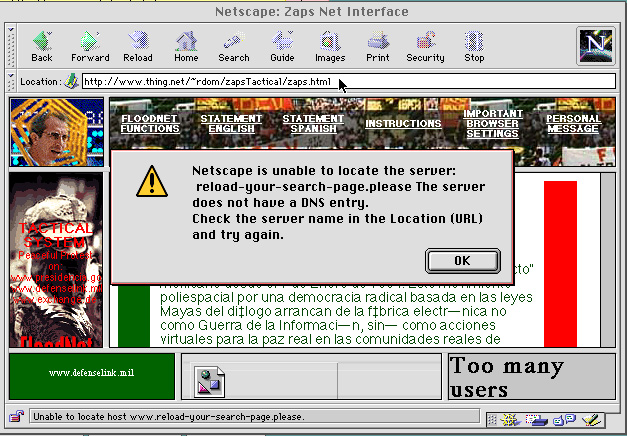
Floodnet software, September 9, 1998

The group's objective was, with the use of digital media and internet based technology, to demonstrate nonviolent resistance in support of the Zapatista rebels residing in the state of Chiapas in Mexico. EDT uses both e-mail and the web to promote their work around the world, encouraging fellow supporters to download and run a tool based on HTML (Hyper Text Markup Language) and Java applet (an internet program used to help support interactive web-based features or programs that a HTML cannot provide alone) called FloodNet. FloodNet is a computer-based program, created by members of the Electronic Disturbance theater company Carmin Karasic and Brett Stalbaum.

The FloodNet program would simply reload a URL for short several times, effectively slowing the website and network server down (a DDOS attack), if a high number of protesters were to join in the sit-in at one time. The EDT would first execute the FloodNet software in what would be for them a dress rehearsal before attacking their main targets on April 10, 1998, and a month later, on both Mexican and American government websites, representing both the Mexican President Ernesto Zedillo and American President Bill Clinton.

FloodNet would work on this basic idea taken from street theater practices and political rallies and protest, but instead present it on a much larger and international stage, with the facilitation of macro-networks and non-digital forms of action. Ricardo Dominguez took up the idea of the Floodnet from the "netstrike" organized by the Florentine group Strano Network. On December 21, 1995, the first world Virtual sit-in, conceived by Tommaso Tozzi, was created by the Florentine group Strano Network against the French government to protest against the nuclear tests in Mururoa and was defined as a "Netstrike".

The EDT's mission was to allow the voices of the Zapatista Army of National Liberation to be heard, after the attack on the small remote village of Acteal in Chiapas, Mexico. The Paramilitary, a government-funded military squad, surrounded a Catholic church during a Tsotsil Mayan (a spoken Mexican language from around the Chiapas area of Mexico) service. For the next several hours the Paramilitary shot everyone to death, those inside the church and any who tried to escape, resulting in the death of fifteen children, nine men, and twenty-one women, four of whom were pregnant, on December 22, 1997. This event became known as the Acteal Massacre. Those who were convicted of this crime were later released in the Supreme Court to the outrage of many, after ignoring eyewitness reports and allowing those who confessed to this crime on humanity. Instead, the Supreme Court focused on the mismanagement of the investigation and the fabrication of evidence.

The Electronic Disturbance Theater took notice of these actions when others did not and arranged their first act of electronic civil disobedience against the Mexican Government. In a subsequent version of FloodNet, those who had downloaded the FloodNet program in support of the Zapatistas were asked to repeatedly input the names of those that had lost their lives at the hands of the Mexican Army in military attacks. This would then target the servers to return an error message each time these URLs would be requested. This data request would be stored in a server's error log and in the eyes of the Zapatista Army of National Liberation and the Electronic Disturbance Theater group, a symbolic list of those 45 Acteal civilians who had died straight to their murderers. If enough people used the FloodNet applet, this would cause the computer server running the website to overload, so that when a regular visitor or someone working within the site tried to access the website or send company based emails and files, the pages would either load extremely slowly or not at all. This worked on the same basis as a real sit-in demonstration, where the protesters block the entrance to a public building of their oppressors and prevent access to the building.

With around 25% of the world's population in one way or another connected to the World Wide Web, dial-up internet connection, wired or wireless internet broadband connection, and even mobile internet technology can all allow the internet to be used as a means of non-violent action within human rights. It is viewable around the world, can be translated into different languages, and most importantly, is not controlled by the government. The EDT networked performances have already opened access and communication between three unlikely micro-networks: net.art, net.activism, and net.hackers. With technology always evolving there is no telling how these areas will grow.

However, on June 10, 1998, the EDT struck the Mexican Secretaria de Gobernacion (Secretary of Government), which is involved in immigration policies as well as Mexico's federal public security forces working in conjunction with the military Zapatista communities in Chiapas unsuccessfully. The Mexican government would have a programmed countermeasure in place. This is what the EDT believe took place. A countermeasure built into the operating JavaScript was placed in the Secretaria de Gobernacion's website that was designed to activate whenever FloodNet was directed toward its servers. Upon activation, the website would open window after window on the FloodNet user's web browser. If the FloodNet user remained connected long enough, their browser, whether it is Netscape or Internet Explorer, could crash the activist's computer, forcing the activist to reboot their system and stopping the FloodNet program at the source. The EDT has since dealt with both the Mexican government both online and offline and the United States Department of Defense, which has now inserted a counter attack system into their web browser-based coding to prevent any more FloodNet-based attacks to the system and server.

The FloodNet system was used again against the World Trade Organization in 1999, where the group would release their online civil disobedience software to the public under the name "Disturbance Development's Kit".

== Electronic Disturbance Theater 2.0 ==
The group received media attention for their 2007 project, the Transborder Immigrant Tool (TBT), which sends experimental poetry to users in addition to helping them find water and safe routes when crossing the Mexican-American border. EDT have described this project as the next step of electronic civil disobedience, or ECD 2.0. The Transborder Immigrant Tool was shown in numerous museums and galleries in 2010, including the California Biennial at the Orange County Museum of Art, the Museum of Contemporary Art San Diego, and the Galería de la Raza in San Francisco. The project is maintained by California Institute for Telecommunications and Information Technology.

Electronic Disturbance Theater came under investigation for their virtual sit-in in support of the 2010 March 4 strikes and occupations in support of public education.

== The Transborder Immigrant Tool (TBT) ==
=== Origins ===
The TBT project was initiated in the late 2000s. In an interview for Arte Útil, Dominguez tells performance art researcher Gemma Medina how the project was inspired by a work that Stalbaum was doing with his artist partner, Paula Poole.

Stalbaum and Poole were considering doing a locative media practice project that used artificial intelligence to consider and examine dangerous hiking roads for a virtual hiker system to aid in areas near Southern California’s deserts. In reaction to this, Dominguez saw the potential to apply this type of location media project to aid migrants' travels through the Sonoran Desert, and later on to also help them potentially locate water caches that would be left by non-governmental organizations.

The project was funded by Dominguez's workplace, the University of San Diego, as well as by Mexican art communities; approximately $10,000 were provided by these two sources. Other parties involved were Water Station Inc. and Border Angels who aided in providing water caches and resources throughout the northern area of the US-Mexico border.

=== How TBT Works ===
The TBT was developed as a mobile app designed to be widely accessible. It uses open-source mapping software to deliver information to migrants crossing the border, including such as location of water, safer routes, and areas to avoid due to border patrol activity. The app was created to use Global Positioning System data and features an interface that accessed maps of the area. The app provides necessary information such as water station locations and safer routes to avoid dangerous areas.

A key element that was embedded in Carroll’s work in The Desert Survival Series (La serie de sobrevivencia del desierto) includes a number of images of code in Java (programming language) intertwined with her poetry, which link directly from the app’s interface. Altogether, the app is a link between experimental poetry produced in The Desert Survival Series and tool's primary functionality to guide traveling migrants.

Some of the main features of the TBT include a guide for immigrants to find water caches, safety instructions for these routes and delivers experimental poetry in both English and Spanish. It's a tool that it is and functions as a form of geo-poetic resistance. The tool itself has sparked a lot of attention and debate because it challenges the way users think about borders and immigration. This has led to differing opinions, with intrigue surrounding how TBT’s innovative poetry offers "the opportunity to consider art’s ability to intervene in the biopolitics of border security," while others find it controversial and misleading, calling it an "irresponsible use of technology."

In an interview with electronic literature professor, Mark Marino, Stalbaum went into detail regarding the working team, and the obstacles they wanted to solve with the TBT. He identifies Jason Najarro (a former undergrad student) and himself as the primary coders for the project. Najarro created and integrated the compass interface, and he completed the research needed to make it user-friendly with the target audience. This involved accounting for interferences, such as dehydration and a debilitated physical state at the intended moment of usage within the travel. Another challenge during a migrant's journey that TBT intended to tackle was “the last mile problem”. This refers to the latter portion of a migrant’s travel when they tend to get lost and are in desperate need of water and guidance. As a result, the main focus of the software was to integrate tools that would provide aiding material such as survival tips, guiding haptic sounds, and a visual interface that would facilitate the search for safety sites and resources. The efficiency of the device was an important aspect, due to the user only having approximately one hour worth of power on their device to use to search for water in a moment when they were most likely at risk of extreme dehydration.

Regarding the software and hardware of the TBT, Stalbaum and other experts have examined the key elements that were integrated into the project. For the software, it was produced in the open-source Java and Java 2 Micro Edition (J2ME) that would be integrated in phones similar to a Motorola i455, which used an IDEN platform. It also used other non-specified software tools and formats from the digital libraries available through Java and J2ME, and WalkingTools. The primary software extension of the Walking Tools used are the NavigatorListener and the DowsingCompassListener.These tools are the foundation for how the migrant would be able to locate the water caches in the desert. They would use “dowsing”/ witching techniques (identified in the code as a “witchingEvent”), as the method for the navigation system. Through the preloaded data of the locations of the water caches, the phone would then transform into a “witching/dowsing” stick that guides through vibration and adaptive haptic audios until they reach the resources.

Another extension essential for the search of water is the moveWarningEnervator that is integrated as a motivational tool. If the traveler becomes too tired to continue the search for the caches, the tool starts to continuously prompt the user to continue moving by sending haptic noises and vibrations to the phone. The extension adheres to repeating the audio and vibrations to the user as a metaphorical warning of the danger of giving up the search. This is accompanied by the prolonging of the length of the vibrations and sounds to help the migrant know they are getting closer to the resources.

TBT was meant to be used during the most vulnerable and challenging parts of the migration journey, typically in desert regions where migrants face extreme temperatures, dehydration, and limited access to resources needed for survival. The tool was specifically designed to provide real-time guidance in areas known to have high levels of migration travelers. The tool’s design offers a unique approach to the idea behind the utilization of technology for “political-control", “surveillance”, or “regulation” and demonstrates how it can be used in humanitarian ways much like this one.

=== Art, Activism, and Ecopoetics ===
In The Desert Survival Series (DSS; La serie de sobrevivencia del desierto) by Carroll, a central component of the Transborder Immigrant Tool project, Carroll’s language vividly portrays the realities of crossing the desert for migrants. Experiences like the soaring heat, the relentless struggle against exhaustion, and the constant tension of the journey are all described throughout experimental poetry. Through vivid metaphors and carefully crafted imagery, Carroll’s contribution paints a picture of the emotions that accompany migrants during the journey, such as fear, loss, and spirals of hope. One powerful example from the series reads, “Por ejemplo, el cactus de barril o biznaga—conocido como cactus brújula—acumula el rocío y la humedad, también proporciona direcciones. Tan claro como una flecha o una constelación, se inclina hacia el sur. Oriéntese haciendo uso de este recurso o por las plantas que florecen, creciendo hacia al sol, ya que éstas siempre apuntan hacia el sur en el Hemisferio Norte.” This reference to the barrel cactus, which accumulates dew and points the way south like a compass. This and many other examples from Carroll’s work emphasize the harsh conditions and environment traveling migrants face during their journey, particularly in the Sonoran Desert. Carroll’s writing addresses the dangers of this landscape through a dialectical approach, illustrating how nature "holds trauma and promise simultaneously," as a way to emphasize the desert's rugged beauty but harsh place for traveling migrants.

Carroll’s Desert Survival Series poems have been read by a number of scholars using a variety of analytic and interpretive framework for its eco poetic purpose. The integration of nature in the poetry is done so, as scholars like Melissa F. Zeiger has pointed out, to shift the incomprehensible environment of the Sonoran Desert to one that is easier to traverse. Zeiger also highlights various ways that Carroll achieves this change of perception of the desert. Some of the main ways are through survival tips related to the use of plants of the desert and the preservation of water. For example, a poem might explain how to identify a cactus that may be used for hydration and consumption purposes. Other poems make eco pop culture references, such as referring to the desert landscape of the novel/tv series of Dune by Frank Herbert, that helps the migrant comprehend the dangers through their familiarity with these. An example of another scholar that has commented on the transformation of the desert’s ecosystem is J.D. Schnepf, a professor of American Studies. Schnepf underlines how these eco elements shifts the migrant’s perception of the desert as a hostile environment to a hospitable landscape. As a result, it creates a relationship between the migrant and the ecosystem. Schnepf and other researchers also compare the Desert Survival Series to Georgic verses due to the material having an agricultural didactical purpose within its content.

=== Deployment ===
TBT was never fully published for the use of current or future migrants crossing the border. While the tool was tested, there were moral challenges faced including the development of narco war, which limited its ability to be released. This challenge lead to tensions between the tool's ability to aid traveling migrants and risk of its misuse that would potentially put those utilizing the device in danger, which eventually lead to stopping its distribution for public use.

=== Controversy, Media and Public Reaction ===
The controversies surrounding the project began as response to a viral article regarding the TBT published on Vice. The article caused polarizing reactions in the media. On March 10th, 2010, Fox News Channel (FNC) published an online article summarizing what they described as “inappropriate use of taxpayer funds and an irresponsible use of technology” regarding the project centers on helping migrants cross the border with the aid of the device. Several figures related to the U.S. government shared their thoughts with FNC. Former U.S. representative Duncan Hunter shared with the outlet how he thought the Department of Defense was being too permissive since it was a public university, and underlined the danger of them functioning as a system that was aiding illegal activities. In an online article for Voice of San Diego, journalist Andrew Donohue has also listed other representatives such as Brian Bilbray and Darrell Issa asking for the funding origin for the project. Nonetheless, he also mentioned the support of humanist activists regarding the project. Others, such as the spokesperson for the Customs and Border Protection Steven Cribby commented that it was not a matter for concern, but stressed the possible false assurance that it might give to future migrants when taking the unpredictable journey to traverse the desert.

In an online article-interview with Leila Nadir on the site Hyperallergic, Dominguez shared that as early as January 11, 2010 and March of the same year, he had already been investigated by the University of California, San Diego regarding the TBT project, and also by the University of California Office of President (UCOP) concerning the protests surrounding student fees. This was followed by an investigation done by the FBI Office of Cybercrime due to some alleged losses reported by the UCOP caused by the protests. Dominguez also emphasized feeling like he was being silenced due to pressure by the University of California, San Diego to sign legally binding contracts that would prevent him from speaking about these events, and that forced him to stop his “artivist performances”. During the period of investigation, one of the topics that surfaced was the possibility of de-tenuring Dominguez. The EDT group also acknowledged the negative press an influence for the decision to not release the project for public use. Instead, the project is now used to reflect on U.S. laws and their impact on immigrants coming to the States.

== See also ==
- Anonymous
- E-democracy
- E-participation
- Electronic civil disobedience
- Hacktivism
- Internet activism
