= Ricardo Dominguez (artist and professor) =

American artist and academic (born 1959)

Ricardo Dominguez (born 1959) is an American artist, professor and chair of the visual arts department at UC San Diego. He has been the subject of controversy over a number of acts of electronic civil disobedience on his own and with the Electronic Disturbance Theater, which he co-founded.

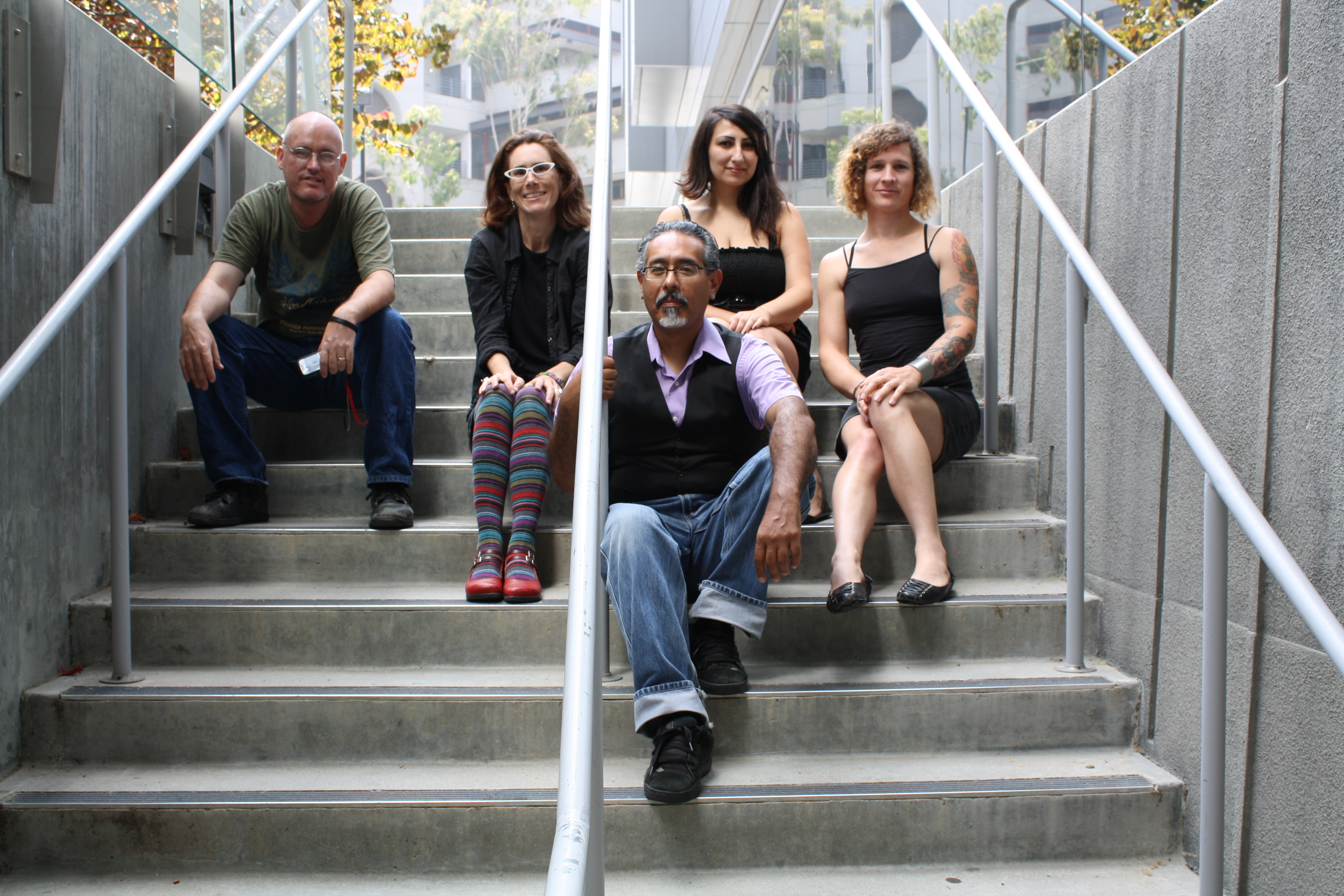
Ricardo Dominguez, center, with Electronic Disturbance Theater 2.0, Photo by Kinsee Morlan

Dominguez, the founder of the Electronic Disturbance Theater, has organized "virtual sit-ins" that attempted to overload and crash websites, for which he and his co-founder developed a program called FloodNet that automatically requests the target page over and over. These events sometimes incorporated a search term, such that the search would return a phrase like "Transparency not found" in the University of California, San Diego website, or "human rights not found" at the website of Mexican President Ernesto Zedillo. On one occasion, the United States Department of Defense diverted a planned attack to a nonexistent website. One goal of the movement is solidarity with Zapatista communities in Chiapas, Mexico. He was part of media freedom protests against suppression of communal media (primarily radio) and was featured in the Wired magazine on the related topics.

Dominguez also helped develop a phone app called the Transborder Immigrant Tool (TBT), which would use GPS technology to help immigrants find water stations in the Southern California desert and which also includes a poetry feature. It also raises awareness about the number of people who die in the U.S.-Mexico border region and aims to rethink the ways in which "immigrants are always presented as less-than-human and certainly not part of a community which is establishing and inventing new forms of life." TBT was subject to considerable controversy initiated by three Republican California congressmen; ultimately the University of California stated that TBT did not misuse research funds, but would not comment on whether it had broken any laws.

In an interview, Dominguez reports that his work, along with that of the Electronic Disturbance Theater, "has been to develop works that can create a performative matrix that activate and take a measure of the current conditions and intensities of power/s, communities and their anxieties or resistances."

From 1988 to 1993, he was a member of Critical Art Ensemble. He was also co-director of The Thing (thing.net) an ISP for artists and activists that started as an art project of Wolgang Staehle. He was a Hellman Fellow, and principal investigator at CALIT2. He was also co-founder of *particle group* with artists Diane Ludin, Nina Waisman, Amy Sara Carroll reflecting on nanotechnology in work *Particles of Interest: Tales of the Matter Market*, presented in Berlin (2007), the San Diego Museum of Art (2008), Oi Futuro, and FILE festivals in Brazil (2008).

In 2015 the mother of one of his students claimed that her daughter was forced to perform nude for her final exam in the class. UCSD officials defended Dominguez saying that the course is not required for graduation and that removing clothing is not a requirement to pass. Dominguez described the prompt in an interview with HyperAllergic, "The students are aware of the “nude/naked” gesture choice from the start of the class. The options are clarified on the first day of class and are also on the syllabus. Students learn that they can do the gesture in any number of ways without actually having to remove their clothes. There are many ways to perform both “nudity” (to do a gesture without clothes) or to do a “naked” gesture (laying bare of one’s most fragile and vulnerable self). One can be naked while being covered.... I maintain an open dialogue with all the students about any concerns or questions they may have both individually or as a group during every 3 hour class (which meets twice a week)."
