= Sheldon Brown (artist) =

American artist (born 1962)

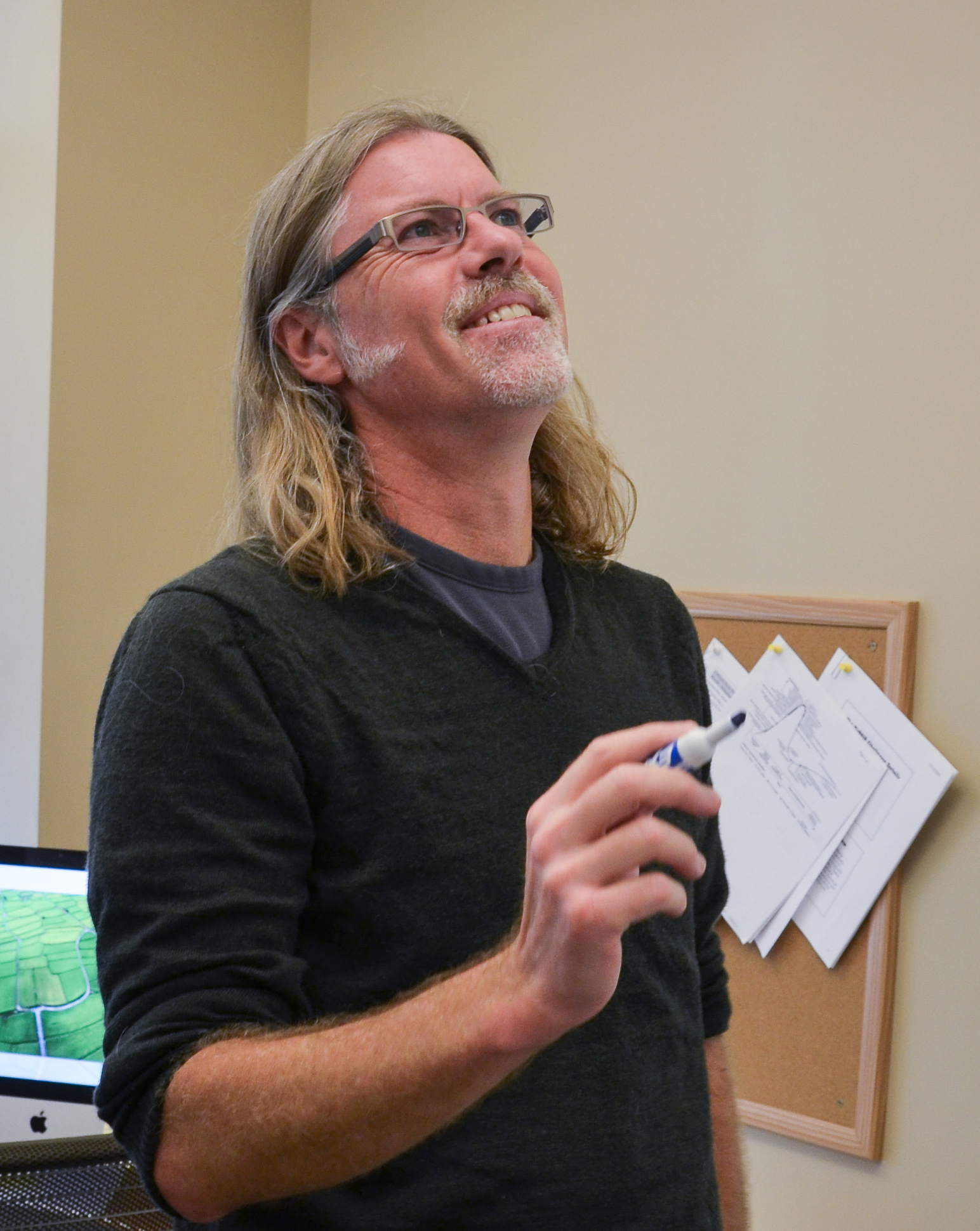
- Born: July 13, 1962 (age 63)
- Occupation: Visual artist

Website
- sheldon-brown.net

Sheldon Brown (born July 13, 1962) is an American artist and former Professor of Computer Art at the University of California, San Diego where he held the John D. and Catherine T. MacArthur Foundation Endowed Chair of Digital Media and Learning. He was the founding director of the Arthur C. Clarke Center for Human Imagination at UCSD, a co-founder of the California Institute of Information Technologies and Telecommunications, where he was Artist-in-Residence, and he was the site director of the Center for Hybrid Multicore Productivity Research at UCSD. He has been a Visiting Arts Professor at NYU Shanghai, an Honorary Professor at Shanghai University and Professor and Research Leader at the Creative Computing Institute, University of the Arts London. His work examines the relationships between mediated and physical experiences.

== Works ==
Brown's projects concerns the overlapping and reconfiguration of private and public spaces and how new forms of mediation are proliferating. Examples include "In the Event" at the KeyArena in Seattle, where nine computers choreographed multiple video streams across 28 monitors in a real-time constructive engagement with the spectator's act of envisioning the events of the arena. In "The Video Wind Chimes", an outdoor video installation/street lighting project, the electromagnetic spectrum used for television broadcast was transformed into the passive illumination of a nocturnal lighting system, articulated by the wind. "Smoke and Mirrors" and "Mi Casa es tu Casa" use the contextual apparatus of museums with adjacent mission scopes to the artworld, for bringing avant-garde strategies to engage social issues to venues that use more pedantic forms of discourse.

His later projects include "The Scalable City", with exhibitions at Ars Electronica, Shanghai MOCA, India International Center in New Delhi, SIGGRAPH 2007 and the National Academy of Sciences; and Istoria, which explores the intersection of the virtual and physical worlds, created with computer-controlled processes, and several interactive environments that use a cross-fertilization of virtual reality and game technologies.

== Media and talks ==
Scalable City was featured on the Souvenirs from Earth television show in both Germany and France. The project was also the subject of ACM publications including Accelerating the Scalable City. Brown has given talks around the world, including TEDxDelMar

Game Theorist Noah-Wardrip Fruin wrote of Brown's Scalable City project that it "may not seem like gameplay at all" and provides the player little structure or agency, but still creates a pleasurable experience of destruction.
