= Elle Mehrmand =

American new media performance artist

Elle Mehrmand is a new media performance artist and musician. Mehrmand's work combines the body and electronics. Her performance art work has been presented at museums, galleries and art festivals throughout the Americas. She is a member of the band Assembly of Mazes.

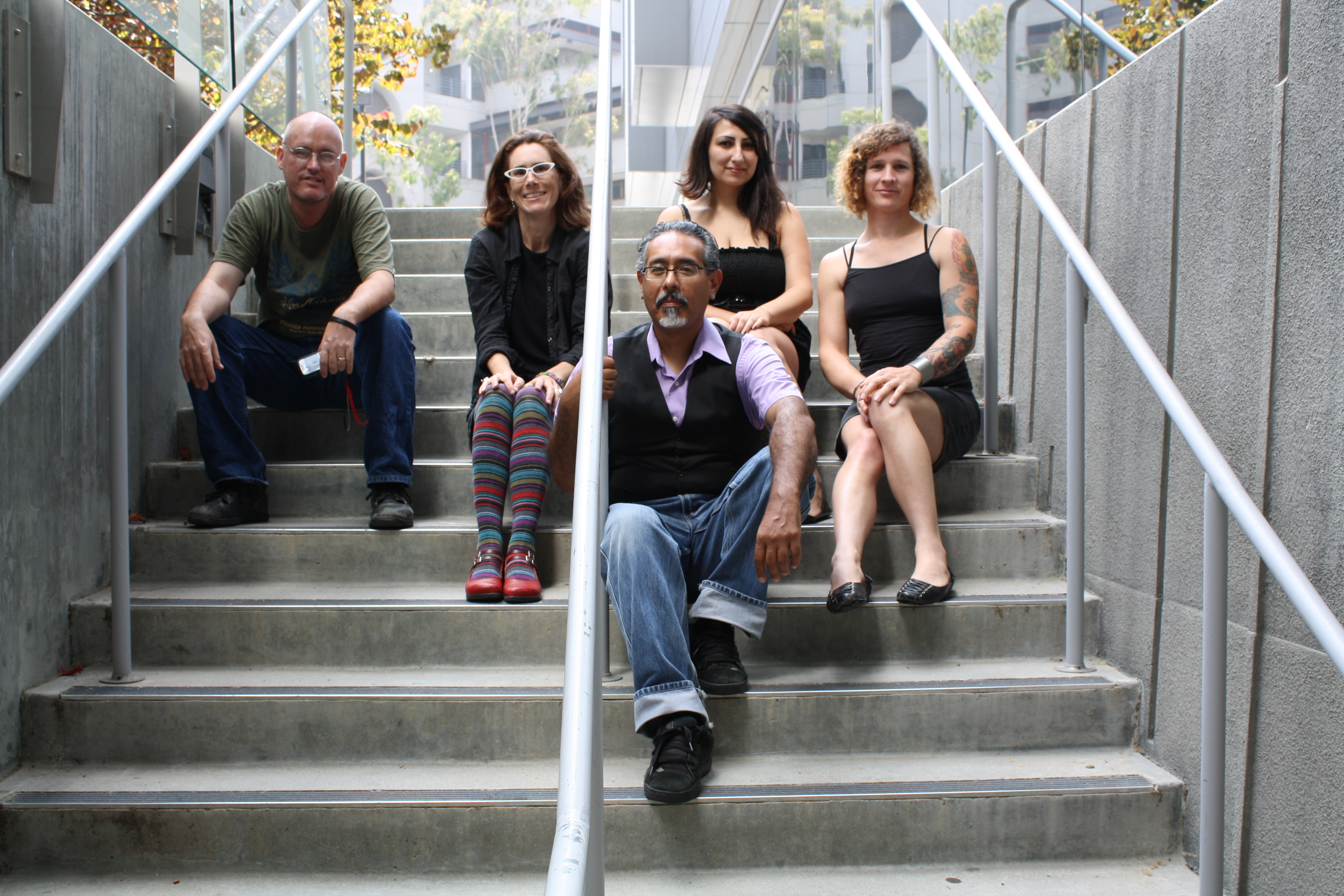
Mehrmand, second from right, with Electronic Disturbance Theater 2.0, Photo by Kinsee Morlan

== Overview ==
She is the singer and trombone player of Assembly of Mazes, a music collective who create dark, electronic, middle eastern, and rhythmic jazz rock. Elle received her MFA from UCSD, and received her BFA in art photography with a minor in music at CSULB. She is a researcher at the Center for Research in Computing and the Arts and the b.a.n.g. lab at UCSD.

== Performances and exhibitions ==
Mehrmand's latest performances explore holographic technology. At the University Art Gallery's "Archive Fever" series, Mehrmand performed "Robert Breitmore will bring a Hologram" using a transparent screen from Reintek.

In November 2010, Mehrmand performed Becoming Transreal with Micha Cárdenas at the UCLA Freud Playhouse. The performance demonstrates the interest in her work across disciplines, as it was supported by the UCLA Department of Theater, School of Theater, Film, and television, LGBT Studies, the Center for the Study of Women, The Center for Research in Engineering, Media and Performance, and the Center for Research in Computing the Arts at UCSD and San Diego State University's Second Life Initiative, Aztlan Island. The performance was reviewed by Linzi Juliano for the Center for the Study of Women.

In January 2010, Mehrmand performed technésexual with Micha Cárdenas at Duke University's Visualization Technology Group's Interactive Studio. The performance was supported by Duke's Women Studies Department, Information Science + Information Studies, Art, Art history and Visual Studies and the Franklin Humanities Institute. The performance was followed up by an artist lecture at the Nasher Museum. Mehrmand's writing about technésexual has also been included in the peer reviewed journal Version.

Mehrmand's work has been shown in numerous museums and galleries in 2010, including the California Biennial at the Orange County Museum of Art, the Museum of Contemporary Art, San Diego, the Galeria de la Raza in San Francisco and the Perform! Now! festival in Chinatown, Los Angeles., Exhibitions in 2009 included "Intimate Simulations" at Lui Velazquez in Tijuana, among others.

Performances and talks in 2009 include technésexual at Arse Elektronika 2009 in San Francisco, at Artivistic 2009 in Montreal and at the Hemispheric Institute of Performance and Politics in Bogotá, Colombia, Slapshock at Compactspace in Los Angeles Dorkbot Socal, Sextrument at Upgrade! Tijuana, Something is Happening and UCSD Open Studios.

Assembly of Mazes has performed recently at the Long Beach Museum of Art, Gallery Azul, the Prospector and the Pasadena Gallery.

== Reviews ==
Mehrmand is a member of the Electronic Disturbance Theater 2.0 and the b.a.n.g. lab, whose project the Transborder Immigrant Tool received extensive media coverage in 2010 around the world in on the web print, television and radio. The project has also been the subject of numerous academic papers, including "Reading the Transborder Immigrant Tool" at MLA 2011 and "The Transborder Immigrant Tool: Violence, Solidarity and Hope in Post-NAFTA Circuits of the Body Elec(tron)ic" at Mobile HCI 2010.

Her performance art work has been reviewed in Art:21, The Los Angeles Times, Reno News & Review, Synthtopia, The UCLA Center for the Study of Women, and Furtherfield.org.

The band Assembly of Mazes' music has been reviewed in the OC Weekly, Artslant and Strung Out Zine

== Awards ==
Mehrmand's erotic mixed reality work has been awarded the Emerging Fields Award from the University of California Institute for Research in the Arts.
