= Virtual sit-in =

Online civil disobedience technique

A virtual sit-in is another way that activists have historically come to refer to a Disturbed Denial-of-Service attack (DDoS). It is a form of electronic civil disobedience (ECD), which include actions performed online to disturb the regular operations of a corporate or governmental website. The most known hacktivist group is Anonymous, formed in 2003 and still active as to 2026, although its operations are much more sporadic, decentralized, and less publicly visible than they were in the 2000s and early 2010s.

Consensus on the exact implications of DDoS in virtual sit-ins is uncertain; whether they are the same or have similar implications. Hundreds of activists will attempt to access a target website simultaneously and repetitively, aiming to cause the website to run slowly or even collapse entirely, ultimately preventing anyone from accessing it. The technological simplicity behind a virtual sit-in makes it an attractive activist strategy, as it doesn’t require sophisticated technical skills to construct or participate in a DDOS.

Due to its popularity in online activism, it is often evocative of in-person activism metaphors and historical symbolism. The name “virtual sit-in” is derived from the sit-ins popular during the civil rights movement of the 1960s and are seen as equivalent to street protests methods online.

Virtual sit-ins are categorized into three different levels of participants’ responsibility and direct involvement. The first is the simplest as it only requires simultaneous action and no hacking skills, consisting of hundreds or thousands of protesters rapidly and manually reloading the target website with the goal of overloading it. The second category requires the use of a pre-installed software that hinders a computer network, such as the LOIC software and previously FloodNet. The last category includes the use of voluntary botnets to launch the attack, significantly increasing the scale and strength of each hacktivist action.

== Examples ==
On December 21, 1995, the first world Virtual sit-in, conceived by Tommaso Tozzi, was created by the Florentine group Strano Network against the French government to protest against the nuclear tests in Mururoa and was defined as a "Netstrike".

On Thursday May 1, 1998, Ricardo Dominguez (co-founder of Electronic Disturbance Theater) and Stefan Wray held a virtual sit-in in which they decided to attack the World Economic Forum (WEF). They did this to support their particular beliefs against anti-globalization. With over 160,000 people who attended the virtual sit-in for reasons that they could not take to the streets of New York City protest. More than 40,000 also downloaded software which made a DDOS attack easier was also recorded. The attack lasted all of Thursday and Friday night.

In 2008, the international collective Anonymous targeted the Church of Scientology through a campaign now as Operation Chanology. Part of the campaign consisted of Distributed Denial-of-Service attack (DDoS), also known as a virtual sit-in, with the aim of hindering accessibility to Scientology websites.

== See also ==
- Electronic civil disobedience
- Hacktivism
