= Smart drink =

Type of beverage

Smart drinks, also known as nootropic drinks, are beverages made from a mix of fruit juices, vitamins, herbal supplements, and a variety of amino acid supplements.

== History ==
The consumption of smart drinks and "smart drugs" began in the early 1980s when baby boomers started using because they believed these products would improve job performance and give them a competitive edge in the workplace. The popularity of smart drinks peaked during the early 1990s, as all-night techno and house music parties took place, events of the underground dance culture at the time, known as "raves". Rave enthusiasts preferred drugs such as ecstasy, methamphetamine, ketamine, or "poppers" to alcohol. Instead of drinking alcoholic beverages at raves, the dancers would drink smart drinks. Smart drinks not only held a novelty factor for the vibrant social subculture, but they also helped rave promoters by eliminating the need to secure alcohol sales permits and therefore allowed raves to be held outside of the traditional nightclub, bar or pub scene.

Smart drink ingredients often include substances such as DL-phenylalanine or L-phenylalanine, L-tyrosine, choline (trimethylaminoethanol), pyroglutamic acid, B vitamins, glucuronolactone, and DMAE (dimethylaminoethanol). These amino acids were claimed to have positive or enhanced effects on alertness, stress resistance and energy levels. Some of the acids, then considered "foods" and nutritional supplements by government agencies like the US Food and Drug Administration (FDA), changed in status and have since been removed from store shelves. Others are still available when prescribed by a doctor.
