= Nina Waisman =

American new media artist

Nina A. Waisman
- Born: United States
- Education: Harvard University (BA); Art Center College of Design (BFA); University of California, San Diego (MFA); Studied ballet at New York City Ballet
- Known for: New media art, interactive sculpture, sound art, performance
- Notable work: Body Envelope (2012); Space Shifter; MediaWomb; Between Bodies (2008)
- Awards: Montalvo Arts Center Fellowship (2013); La MaMa (2011); OCMA (2010)

Nina A. Waisman is an American new media artist who works with sculpture, sound, architecture, and performance.

== Education ==
Nina Waisman graduated from Art Center College of Design with a BFA in Fine Arts and went on to receive a Bachelor of Arts in Visual and Environmental Studies at Harvard University. Waisman obtained a Masters of Fine Arts in Visual Arts at University of California, San Diego, where she focused on multimedia as well as new media works. She studied ballet at the New York City Ballet.

== Career ==
Nina Waisman is notable for interactive sculptures that include sound and performance such as Body Envelope, in 2012, a series of performances that involves instruments and the human body. Sounds from far-flung places are projected through instruments to the visitor's peripersonal space through motion detecting sensors. She also uses motion detectors to promote audience participation in her performances in Space Shifter which is composed of twelve sensory cables that bend in the form of a portal and are suspended against a wall. As visitors move their bodies within the portal of sensors, sound is emitted. The pitch, speed, volume, and quality of the sound changes according to the visitor's physical proximity to the sensors. Nina Waisman pulls many of her soundscapes from Tijuana, Mexico. In MediaWomb, Waisman uses recycled cardboard in the form of egg cartons to create an encasing womblike sculpture; one side of the sculpture emits local soundscapes of Tijuana while the other side emits global soundscapes of the media. Within the sculpture, visitors sits at opposite sides facing each other. Depending on the side the visitor is sitting on, they experience the sculpture differently. Visitor interaction is also apparent in her earlier work Between Bodies in 2008. It's an interactive sound and sculpture installation that brings the busy atmosphere of Tijuana to the visitors through speakers. As visitors move through the hall way filled with these instruments, they are transported metaphysically to Tijuana. The sounds range from the noises in the streets created by cars to local human activity.

=== List of recent group shows ===
- Zero1 Biennial 2012
- ISEA 2012
- Play With Me 2012
- Mediated Motion 2011

=== Grants ===
Nina Waisman has received numerous awards and grants throughout her career. The most notable grants are from the Montalvo Arts Center for a visual arts fellowship in 2013, La MaMa for her Rhythm Machine 2011, and OCMA for her Between Bodies in Cecut 2010.
