= BlueServo =

Defunct American border surveillance focused tech company

BlueServo was an American company whose primary service was the Virtual Community Watch, which attempted to crowdsource the surveillance of the Texas-Mexico border.

== Virtual Community Watch ==
BlueServo's site allowed for online users to watch video feeds from near the US-Mexico border and report people they saw on the cameras. The initiative, first proposed in June 2006, was initially launched by the State of Texas in 2007. The service was backed by the Texas Border Sheriffs' Coalition and was endorsed by governor Rick Perry, despite 2009 criticisms arguing that the service has been ineffective in reducing the flow of illegal immigration.

In the first 6 months, only 13 of the expected 200 cameras were installed along the 1,254 miles of Texas-Mexico border and only three arrests instead of the expected 1,200. It came under scrutiny on issues of civil liberties and the stoking of nativist sentiment.

In 2014, the Perry administration cancelled funding for Virtual Community Watch.
