= Electrohippies =

The Electrohippies Collective (Ehippies) is an international group of internet activists based in Oxfordshire, England, whose purpose is to express disapproval of governmental policies of mass media censorship and control of the Internet "in order to provide a 'safe environment' for corporations to do their deals."

== Significant actions ==
=== Against the WTO, 1999 ===
The protest against the World Trade Organization (WTO) in Seattle in 1999 was a signal event in the anti-globalisation movement. Thousands of people gathered to disrupt the World Trade Organisation conference by preventing delegates from entering the conference venue. Simultaneously, an online direct protest was run by The Electrohippies Collective with what is now a familiar aspect of cyber space: a denial-of-service (DOS) action. This tactic blocked the computer network servicing the WTO meeting by flooding it with requests. The Ehippies claimed success for the action, saying 450,000 people participated over 5 days, resulting in the WTO conference network being constantly slowed and periodically brought to a halt.

Their claim was disputed by staff of Conxion, the ISP hosting the conference website, who deployed a URL rewriting rule to redirect attack traffic to the attack page itself. It was claimed that this counter-attack "crashed" the Ehippies' server within seconds, forcing them to move to another ISP. The majority of hits to the Ehippies' site were thus their own attack page attacking itself. Conxion claimed to have logged fewer than 10,000 unique-source IP addresses. The attack page consisted of nine frames, three attacking the San Jose conference server, three against the Virginia server and three against the main WTO server. The Chicago conference server was not attacked and remained entirely unaffected. However, the WTO main website server, hosted by another provider, did not benefit from the rewrite-engine fix and did suffer significantly from the DOS attack.

The Ehippies justified their campaign tactic as enabling tens of thousands of remote computer users to join the Seattle protest action. They pointed out that the action could not have worked without the support of sufficient people—purporting to demonstrate that there was significant support for their action.

=== Against the IMF/WB, 2000 ===
As a follow-up to their WTO action, the Ehippies and volunteers tried to shut down the International Monetary Fund (IMF) and World Bank websites by a "virtual sit-in" in conjunction with 'real world' protests in Washington, D.C. in April 2000. Some 5000 online participants were able to cause only intermittent slowdowns on those sites.

=== Response to 'anti-terror' laws ===
The collective was forced to subside temporarily into inaction by the British government's The Terrorism Act 2000 and The Regulation of Investigatory Power Act 2000, perceived as significantly changing the right of British citizens to freely use the internet for political and protest action. Now it "focusses on the use of technology by activists, mainly through organising workshops and quietly assisting 'behind the scenes' of other campaigns. Current campaigns are the "Simple" energy-focused campaign and the "Browser Alert" campaign against proprietary software abuses and Digital rights management.

== See also ==
- World Trade Organization Ministerial Conference of 1999
- WTO Ministerial Conference of 1999 protest activity
- 1998 MAI failure
- 30 Frames a Second: The WTO in Seattle 2000 Documentary film shot in 1999 and released in 2000
- Yes Men's cyber attack on the WTO
- Zippie Internet Invasion of the UK
- Anonymous, hacktivist group of American origin
