= Fembot Collective =

Feminist collective

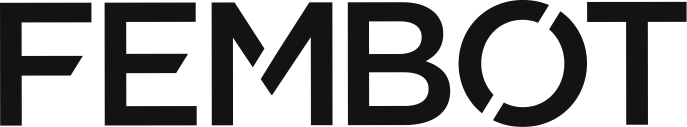
- Formation: 2011
- Founder: Carol Stabile
- Founded at: University of Oregon
- Main organ: Ada: A Journal of Gender, New Media, and Technology
- Website: fembotcollective.org

The Fembot Collective is an international collective of feminist media activists, artists, producers, and scholars that published the academic journal Ada: A Journal of Gender, New Media, and Technology. Fembot has been a catalyst for multiple large scale feminist digital projects, providing the digital and social infrastructure for FemTechNet, publishing the podcast series Books Aren't Dead, and hosting collaborative hack-a-thons and Wikipedia edit-a-thons with Ms. magazine. Although having been funded and supported by multiple institutions including School of Journalism and Communication and the Center for the Study of Women in Society at the University of Oregon., Fembot is concentrated in the University of Maryland currently.

== History ==
The Fembot Collective was initially developed at the University of Oregon, where it was originally a research interest group led by Carol Stabile located in the Center for the Study of Women in Society. Officially founded in 2011, the group grew out of conversations about the use of feminist ethics to guide transformations in open access and new media pedagogy that began as early as 2008. Early projects for Fembot included the short zine series Laundry Day edited by Carol Stabile and Chelsea Bullock, and a feminist works series that spotlighted new media artists and critics. Fembot launched its first issue of Ada: A Journal of Gender, New Media, and Technology in November 2012.

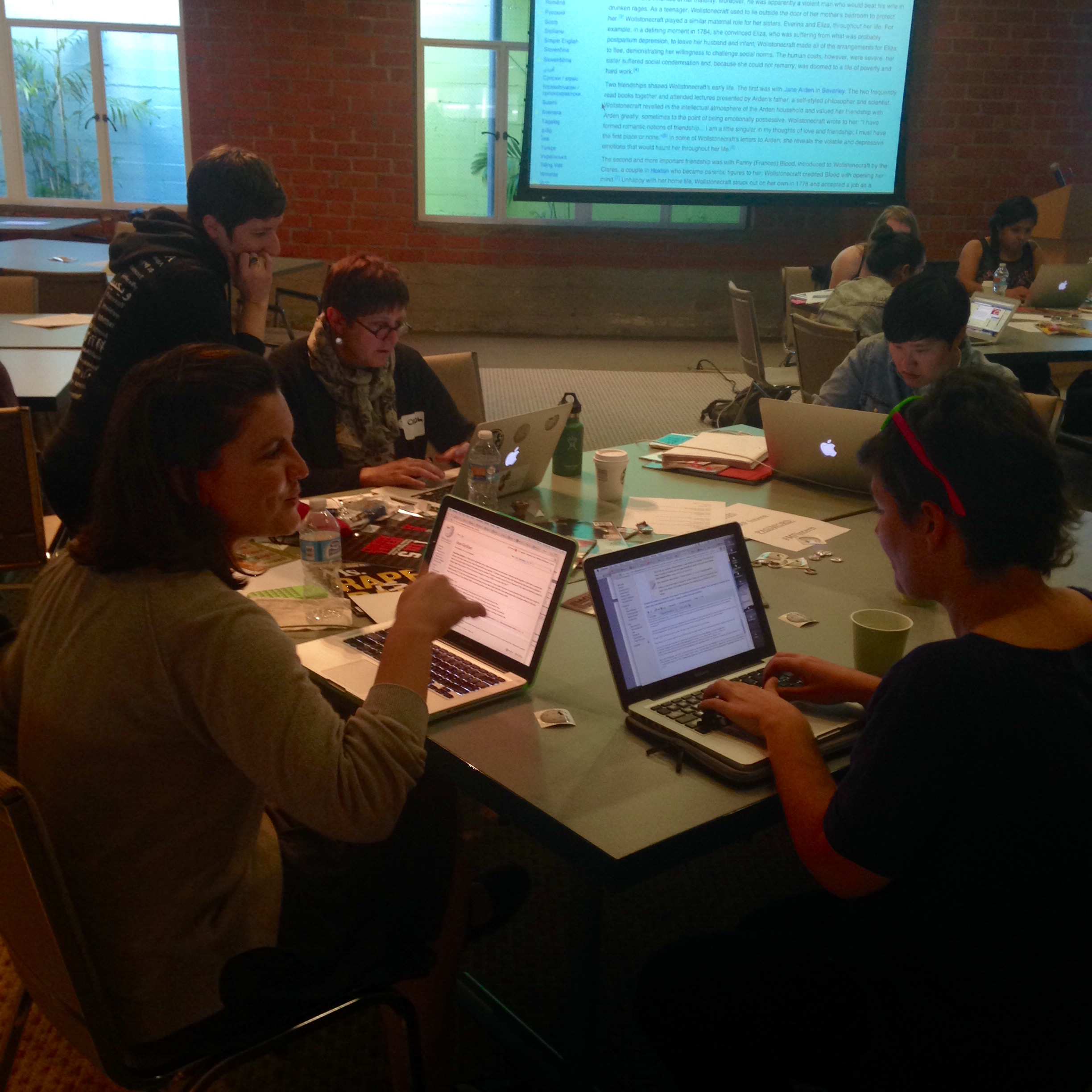
Ms. FemBot edit-a-thon in Los Angeles in 2015

Since 2015, Fembot has established a partnership with Ms. magazine around writing women academics, theorists, and athletes into Wikipedia. The organization is currently led by Carol Stabile.

== Ada: A Journal of Gender, New Media, and Technology ==
Ada: A Journal of Gender, New Media, and Technology is a feminist open access journal published in collaboration with the Fembot Collective. It has been housed at UO Libraries and now is administered through the University of Maryland. Notably, the journal challenges conventional academic journal practices by using an open peer review process.

In 2014, Gamergate supporters targeted Ada: A Journal of Gender, New Media, and Technology as a site of "feminist propaganda," arguing that "feminist scholars have used the journal as an outlet for propaganda, allowing them to avoid the peer review processes of traditional journals." In response, Fembot members and others created a bibliography of critical resources for studying the gendered dimensions of the Gamergate controversy, published by the International Communication Association.
