= Pronoia (psychology) =

Phenomenon akin to the opposite of paranoia

Pronoia describes a state of mind that is the opposite of paranoia. Whereas a person suffering from paranoia feels that persons or entities are conspiring against them, a person experiencing pronoia believes that the world around them conspires to do them good. The belief can be an irrational belief subject to medical diagnosis, or an enthusiastic, spiritual belief. It's also akin to a highly optimistic view of life and its circumstances.

== Definition ==
The word appeared in the psychological literature in 1982, when the academic journal Social Problems published an article entitled "Pronoia" by Dr. Fred H. Goldner of Queens College in New York City, in which Goldner described a phenomenon opposite to paranoia and provided numerous examples of specific persons who displayed such characteristics:

Pronoia is the positive counterpart of paranoia. It is the delusion that others think well of one. Actions and the products of one's efforts are thought to be well received and praised by others. Mere acquaintances are thought to be close friends; politeness and the exchange of pleasantries are taken as expressions of deep attachment and the promise of future support. Pronoia appears rooted in the social complexity and cultural ambiguity of our lives: we have become increasingly dependent on the opinions of others based on uncertain criteria.

== See also ==
- Grandiose delusions
- Ideas of reference
- Paranoia
