= Julia Mundy =

American physicist

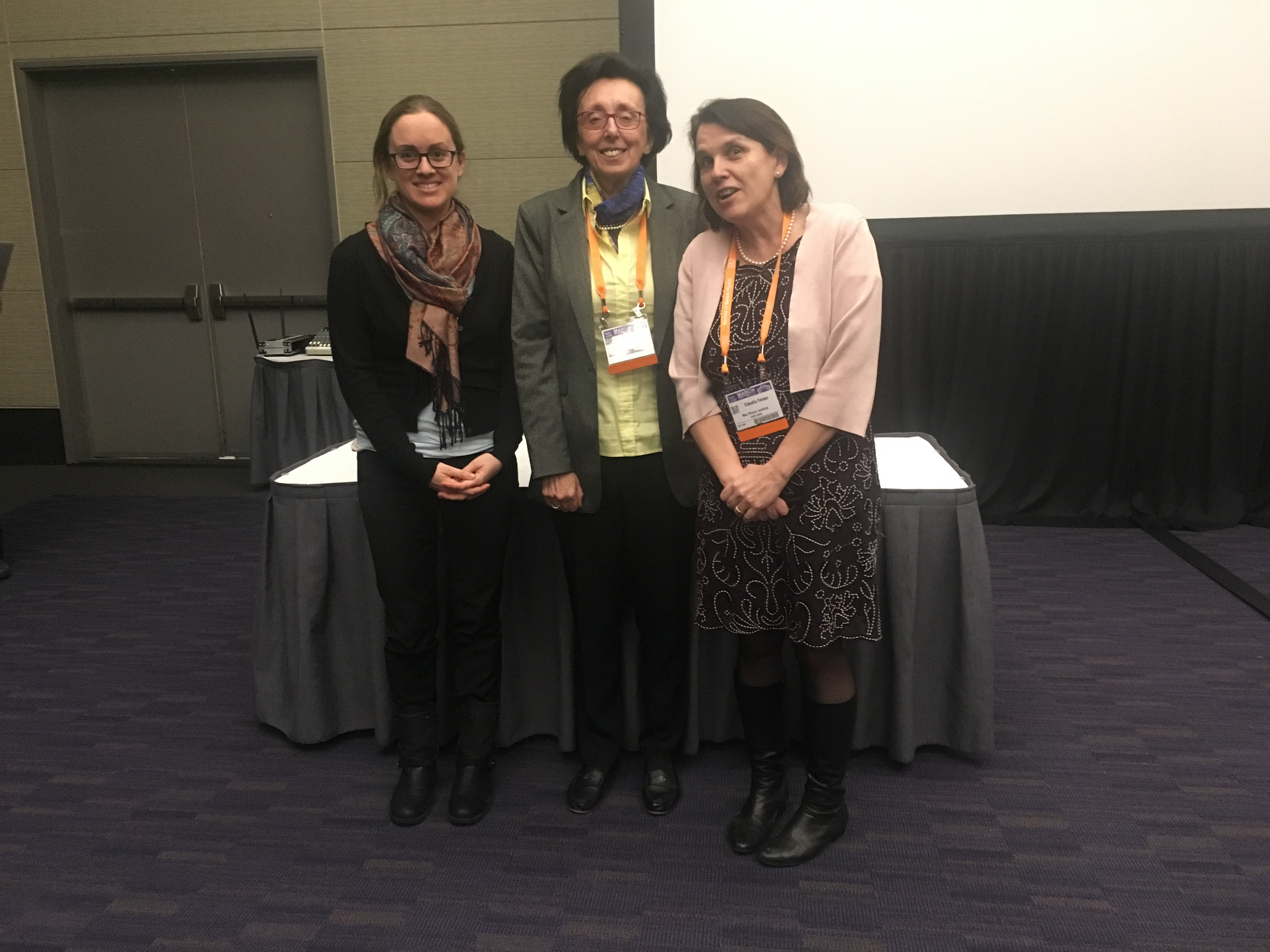
- Photo of Julia Mundy, Giulia Galli, and Claudia Felser, winners of the 2019 APS DMP Awards.
- Education: Cornell University; Harvard University
- Scientific career
- Doctoral advisor: Darrell Schlom; David A. Muller

Julia Mundy is an American experimental condensed matter physicist. She was awarded the 2019 George E. Valley Jr. Prize by the American Physical Society (APS) for "the pico-engineering and synthesis of the first room-temperature magnetoelectric multi-ferroic material." This prize recognizes an "individual in the early stages of his or her career for an outstanding scientific contribution to physics that is deemed to have significant potential for a dramatic impact on the field." She is an associate professor of physics at Harvard University in Cambridge, Massachusetts.

== Early life and education ==
Mundy received bachelor's degrees in chemistry and physics from Harvard University in 2006. She also completed a master's degree in chemistry during her fourth year. From 2006 to 2008, she taught high school chemistry, physics and physical science in Baton Rouge and New Haven through Teach for America.

Mundy received her Ph.D. in applied physics from Cornell University in 2014, where she was a National Science Foundation and National Defense Science and Engineering Graduate Fellow. The title of her thesis is "Atomic-Resolution Two-Dimensional Mapping Of Local Bonding Changes At Transition Metal Oxide Interfaces." Her thesis advisors were Darrell Schlom, a professor of industrial chemistry at Cornell University, and David A. Muller, a professor of engineering at Cornell University.

== Career ==
After receiving her Ph.D., in 2014 she was appointed the inaugural American Physical Society (APS) and the American Institute of Physics (AIP) STEM Education Fellow. On receiving the appointment she said ""I think it's a great opportunity," adding "there hasn't been a strong presence of scientists in the Department of Education, so I'm really excited for the opportunity." In this role, she worked at the Department of Education on science and math education policies. Mundy was a postdoc at Berkeley from 2015 to 2017, working with Ramamoorthy Ramesh on atomic-resolution imaging of complex oxide heterostructures. In 2018 she became an assistant professor of physics at Harvard University in Cambridge, Massachusetts.

=== Awards ===
She was awarded the University of California President's Postdoctoral Fellowship. In 2017 she was awarded the Oxide Electronics Prize for Excellency in Research for "utilizing analytic electron microscopy to understand the connection between atomic structure and ferroelectricity in geometric ferroelectrics, using this new knowledge to engineer superior materials – in particular for creating the world's highest temperature ferrimagnetic ferroelectric using atomically engineered ferroic layers." In 2018, Mundy was named a Moore Fellow in Materials Synthesis, was appointed to the faculty of the Physics Department of Harvard University. She was then selected as the inaugural recipient of an award from the Aramont Fund for Emerging Science Research, which supports high-risk, high-reward scientific research at Harvard University. She was awarded the funding for her project titled "Discovery of a topological superconductor for faultless quantum computing," in which she aims to construct a new material system that could form the backbone of a novel quantum information platform. In 2019 she was received the George E. Valley Jr. Prize for her work designing the first strong room-temperature multiferroic material. In 2021 she received an Early Career Research Program Award from the US Department of Energy for Epitaxial Stabilization of Novel Superconductors.

=== Research ===
Mundy's research focuses on materials synthesis. She uses advanced thin film deposition techniques and electron microscopy to design, synthesize, and characterize complex materials with sub-Angstrom resolution. She is best known for her work on room temperature multiferroics. These materials are desirable in the electronics industry because they promise the ability to read and write data with much less power than today's devices, and can preserve that data when power is shut off. Ideally, they could "enable devices that require only brief pulses of electricity instead of the constant stream that's needed for current electronics, using an estimated 100 times less energy." Mundy noted that "developing materials that can work at room temperature makes them viable candidates for today's electronics."
