= Maia Vergniory =

Spanish computational chemist

- Born: Maia Garcia Vergniory
- Education: University of the Basque Country; Joseph Fourier University
- Scientific career
- Fields: Electronic structure Magnetism; Spin; Metals; Topological insulators
- Workplaces: Université de Sherbrooke; Donostia International Physics Center; Ikerbasque; Max Planck Institute for Chemical Physics of Solids
- Thesis: Gorputz anitzen eta banda-egituraren efektuak egoera elektroniko kitzikatuen zein ioi higikorren eta gainazal solidoen arteko elkerrekintzaren gainean (2008)
- Doctoral advisor: Jose Maria Pitarke de la Torre and Pedro Miguel Echenique
- Website: maiagv-dipc.org

Maia Garcia Vergniory is a Spanish computational physicist who is a Professor at the University of Sherbrooke. Her work in topological quantum chemistry investigates the phases of topological materials. She was elected Fellow of the American Physical Society in 2022.

== Early life and education ==
Vergniory was born in Getxo. She was a doctoral researcher at the University of the Basque Country. Her research considered many-body effects on the interactions between excited electronic states and the mobile ions on surfaces. She started working on topological materials in 2012.

== Research and career ==
Vergniory worked as a research fellow at the Ikerbasque and the Donostia International Physics Center. She studied novel materials and computational strategies to realise new condensed matter systems.

Verginory became interested in the design of new topological materials with optimised functional properties. Topological materials are insulators in the bulk but conductive on their surfaces. The conducting channels that facilitate current flow are robust and independent of size.

Vergniory studied the Inorganic Crystal Structure Database to identify topologically nontrivial materials. She designed a computational effort to simulate real materials and determine whether or not they showed topological properties. This included complex theoretical analysis that could classify topological phases, and information from materials scientists on whether materials were suitable or not. Vergniory uses her supercomputers to perform her calculations ab initio. In an interview with Physics World, Verginory said that she had been surprised by how many materials she identified with topological properties. As an output of this work, the high-order topological insulator Bi_{4}Br_{4} was synthesised and studied experimentally. She showed that if it was possible to identify the symmetry of the crystalline symmetry of a material, she could easily anticipate the behaviour of the charge. She has since started investigating organic materials. She believes that topological crystals with a chiral structure will display several exotic physical phenomena.

=== Awards and honours ===
- 2017 L'Oréal-UNESCO For Women in Science Award
- 2022 Elected a Fellow of the American Physical Society

=== Selected publications ===
- Frank Schindler; Ashley M Cook; Maia G Vergniory; Zhijun Wang; Stuart Parkin; Andrei Bernevig; Titus Neupert (1 June 2018). "Higher-order topological insulators". Science Advances. 4 (6) eaat0346. arXiv:1708.03636. doi:10.1126/sciadv.aat0346. ISSN 2375-2548. PMC 5983919. PMID 29869644. Wikidata Q55280643.
- Barry Bradlyn; Luis Elcoro; Jennifer Cano; M G Vergniory; Zhijun Wang; Claudia Felser; Mois Ilia Aroyo; B Andrei Bernevig (1 July 2017). "Topological quantum chemistry". Nature. 547 (7663): 298–305. arXiv:1703.02050. doi:10.1038/nature23268. ISSN 1476-4687. PMID 28726818. Wikidata Q59066613. (erratum)
- Barry Bradlyn; Jennifer Cano; Zhijun Wang; M G Vergniory; C Felser; R J Cava; B Andrei Bernevig (21 July 2016). "Beyond Dirac and Weyl fermions: Unconventional quasiparticles in conventional crystals". Science. 353 (6299) aaf5037. arXiv:1603.03093. doi:10.1126/science.aaf5037. ISSN 0036-8075. PMID 27445310. Zbl 1355.81174. Wikidata Q53057429.
