= Pedro Miguel Etxenike =

Basque physicist and former Minister of Education of the Basque Autonomous Community

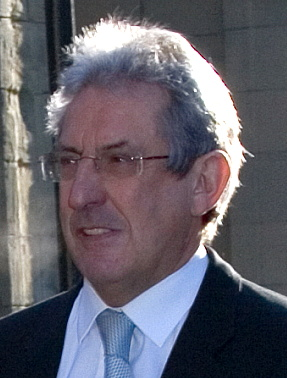
- Born: Pedro Miguel Etxenike Landiribar
- Education: University of Navarre, University of Cambridge, Autonomous University of Barcelona
- Scientific career
- Fields: Semiconductor physics, surface physics, optical spectroscopy, plasmonics, topological insulators
- Workplaces: Donostia International Physics Center, University of the Basque Country, Cavendish Laboratory, Basque Government, University of Barcelona, Niels Bohr Institute, Oak Ridge National Laboratory
- Thesis: Interaction of electronic particles with surfaces (1976)
- Doctoral advisor: John Pendry
- Doctoral students: Maia Vergniory

Pedro Miguel Etxenike Landiribar, also known as Pedro Miguel Echenique (born 8 June 1950, Isaba, Navarre), is a Basque theoretical solid-state physicist, Professor of Condensed Matter Physics at the University of the Basque Country (UPV/EHU), and former minister of the Basque Autonomous Community.

== Early life and education ==
Etxenike was the son of a medical doctor, Pedro Etxenike, and a teacher, Felisa Landiribar. Growing up with one brother and one sister in a small navarrese village (with about 800 inhabitants at the time) he later attended a Capuchin boarding school He attended the University of Navarre and graduated in physics in 1972, receiving the Special Degree Prize and End-of-Studies Award.

In 1973, he began his studies at the University of Cambridge with a March stipend. In 1976, he obtained his Ph.D. (with a thesis directed by John Pendry) and, in 1977, he received a doctorate in physics from the Autonomous University of Barcelona, for which he received the Special Doctorate Prize.

== Career and research ==
After postdoctoral positions at the Oak Ridge National Laboratory in Tennessee and as Nordita Fellow of the Niels Bohr Institute in Copenhagen and with stays at Lund University he became professor of solid state physics at the University of Barcelona in 1978. In 1980, he stepped down from this position to join the government of the Basque Autonomous Region. In 1984, he returned to academia as a visiting lecturer at the Cavendish Laboratory in Cambridge. In 1986, he moved back to his native Basque Country as professor of condensed matter physics at the University of the Basque Country (UPV/EHU) at its campus in Donostia / San Sebastián. Since 1999 he is also president of the Donostia International Physics Center (DIPC).

Etxenike has co-authored over 400 scientific articles. His research has focused on explaining the behaviour of solid bodies and their interaction with beams of charged particles. His work has opened new lines of research and has stimulated innovative theoretical and experimental lines of work in very diverse fields of condensed matter physics such as electron and tunnel microscopy, physical chemistry on the femtosecond scale, electronic surface localization, reverse photo-emission, atomic collisions, the interaction of ions with plasma particles, ion implantation and surface excitations in superfluid helium.

Many works, starting with his PhD thesis in Cambridge study the interaction of electrons, atoms, and ions with surfaces. An important concept introduced and developed by Etxenike are image-potential states at metal surfaces in which electrons can be trapped in the potential of their own image charge. Etxenike and co-workers computed and analyzed these states for many different materials and surfaces as well as their interaction with surface excitations such as surface plasmons, surface plasmon polaritons, and surface phonons. Etxenike is co-author of a highly cited review on the theory of surface plasmons.

They analyzed theoretically the technique of scanning tunneling microscopy (STM) in order to interpret STM images and, in particular, relate them to the topography of the studied surfaces and to the spectroscopy of surface states ("scanning tunneling spectroscopy"). Etxenike has directed 27 PhD theses.

He has been very active in recent years, giving numerous lectures in different university, cultural and business forums, at which he has always defended the cultural value of scientific activity and encouraged young people to pursue science. He co-organized outreach activities such as since 2010 the triennial festival "Passion for Knowledge" in San Sebastián.

=== Publications ===
- P.M. Echenique (1985). "Image-potential-induced surface states". J. Phys. C: Solid State Phys. 18: L1133. doi:10.1088/0022-3719/18/36/004.
- P.M. Echenique; J.B. Pendry (1989). "Theory of image states at metal surfaces". Progress in Surface Science. 32 (2): 111–159. Bibcode:1989PrSS...32..111E. doi:10.1016/0079-6816(89)90015-4.
- J.M. Pitarke; V.M. Silkin; E.V. Chulkov; P.M. Echenique (2006). "Theory of surface plasmons and surface-plasmon polaritons". Rep. Prog. Phys. 70 (1): 1–87. arXiv:cond-mat/0611257. Bibcode:2007RPPh...70....1P. doi:10.1088/0034-4885/70/1/R01. S2CID 46471088.
- D. Codruta Marinica; M. Zapata; P. Nordlander; A.K. Kazansky; P.M. Echenique; J. Aizpurua; A.G. Borisov (2015). "Active quantum plasmonics". Science Advances. 1 (11) e1501095. Bibcode:2015SciA....1E1095M. doi:10.1126/sciadv.1501095. PMC 4730853. PMID 26824066.
- A.L. Cavalieri; N. Müller; Th. Uphues; V.S. Yakovlev; A. Baltuška; B. Horvath; B. Schmidt; L. Blümel; R. Holzwarth; S. Hendel; M. Drescher; U. Kleineberg; P.M. Echenique; R. Kienberger; F. Krausz; U. Heinzmann (2007). "Attosecond spectroscopy in condensed matter". Nature. 449 (7165): 1029–1032. Bibcode:2007Natur.449.1029C. doi:10.1038/nature06229. PMID 17960239. S2CID 4341749.

=== Honors and awards ===
- 1998 Premio Principe de Asturias
- 1998 Max-Planck Forschungspreis (of Max Planck Society and Alexander von Humboldt Foundation)
- 2002 Medalla de Oro de la Real Sociedad Española de Física
- 2005 Premio Nacional de Investigación Blas Cabrera
- 2014 he was elected to the Spanish Royal Academy of Sciences, becoming a full member (Académico numerario) in 2017
- 2018 honorary member of the European Physical Society
- He is Fellow of the American Physical Society (since 1990) and foreign member of the Royal Academy of Science, Letters and Fine Arts of Belgium.
- He received many honours in the Basque Country and Navarre, among them the Premio Vasco Universal by the Basque Government (1999), the gold medals of UPV/EHU (1998), of San Sebastián (2000), of Gipuzkoa (2010), and of Navarre (2016), and he is "favoured son" (Hijo Predilecto) of his native town Isaba (1998).
- He has received honorary doctorates from the universities of Cambridge (D.Sc. in 1998), Complutense de Madrid, Valladolid, Navarra, Aalto (2016),, of the Universidad Autónoma de Santo Domingo (2017) and of the Autonomous University of Madrid (2024).

== Political activity ==
In 1980 he gave up his professorship in Barcelona to join the first government of the Basque Autonomous Community after the Francoist dictatorship. In the government of Carlos Garaikoetxea he first served as Minister of Education and in 1983 he became minister of education and culture and spokesman for the government until the end of the legislative period in 1984. One of the milestones in this legislative period was the law on the normalisation of the use of Basque language, for which Etxenike was the driving force and proponent. These early years of the Department of Education were also crucial in putting in place most of the foundations in the education system of the Basque Autonomous Community, including freedom of education. The setting up of R&D centres and the internationalization of study scholarships were also promoted.

After leaving government politics, Etxenike continues to play an important role in the science policy of the Basque Country. He was central in founding and leading a number of centers, agencies, and initiatives that are now leading research institutions in the Basque Country. He is the founder and first president of Donostia International Physics Center (DIPC), founded in 1999. He was a promoter and creator of the mixed CSIC-UPV/EHU centre, the Centre for Materials Physics (CFM) and was its first director (1999–2001) and is still president of the Materials Physics Center associated with CFM. He played a similar role for the nanoscience research center CIC nanoGUNE (founded 2009) and was until 2019 chairman of its governing board.

In 2007, he was among the founders of the Academy of Sciences, Arts and Letters of the Basque Country Jakiunde and served as its first president until 2012. He then was named honorary chairman. Other positions held include membership of the governing board of the CSIC (Spanish National Research Council) (2001–2007), deputy chairperson of the board of the Franco-Spanish Euskampus Foundation, and vice-chairmanship of the innovation agency of the Basque government, Innobasque (2008–2012). Since 2012 he chairs the panel of judges of the Princess-of-Asturias-Prize for Scientific and Technical Research.
