= Universal memory =

Proposed form of computer storage

Universal memory refers to a computer data storage device combining the cost benefits of DRAM, the speed of SRAM, the non-volatility of flash memory along with infinite durability, and longevity. Such a device, if it ever becomes possible to develop, would have a far-reaching impact on the computer market. Some doubt that such a type of memory will ever be possible.

Computers, for most of their recent history, have depended on several different data storage technologies simultaneously as part of their operation. Each one operates at a level in the memory hierarchy where another would be unsuitable. A personal computer might include a few megabytes of fast but volatile and expensive SRAM as the CPU cache, several gigabytes of slower DRAM for program memory, and Hundreds of GB to a few TB of slow but non-volatile flash memory or "spinning platter" hard disk drive for long-term storage. For example, a university recommended students entering in 2015–2016 to have a PC with:

- a CPU with a 4×256 KB L2 cache, and a 6 MB L3 cache
- 16 GB DRAM
- 256 GB solid-state drive, and
- 1 TB hard disk drive

Researchers seek to replace these different memory types with one single type to reduce the cost and increase performance. For a memory technology to be considered a universal memory, it would need to have best characteristics of several memory technologies. It would need to:

- operate very quickly – like SRAM cache
- support a practically unlimited number of read/write cycles – like SRAM and DRAM
- retain data indefinitely without using power – like flash memory and hard disk drives, and
- be sufficiently large for common operating systems and application programs, yet affordable – like hard disk drives.

The last criterion is likely to be satisfied last, as economies of scale in manufacturing reduce cost. Many types of memory technologies have been explored with the goal of creating a practical universal memory. These include:

- low-voltage, non-volatile, compound-semiconductor memory (demonstrated)
- magnetoresistive random-access memory (MRAM) (in development and production)
- bubble memory (1970-1980, obsolete)
- racetrack memory (currently experimental)
- ferroelectric random-access memory (FRAM) (in development and production)
- phase-change memory (PCM)
- programmable metallization cell (PMC)
- resistive random-access memory (RRAM)
- nano-RAM
- memristor-based memory

Since each memory has its limitations, none of these have yet reached the goals of universal memory.
