= Claudia Felser =

German solid state chemist and materials scientist (born 1962)

- Born: 28 July 1962 (age 64); Aachen, Germany
- Education: University of Cologne
- Spouse: Stuart Parkin
- Scientific career
- Fields: Physics; Chemistry; Materials Science
- Workplaces: University of Mainz; Max Planck Institute for Chemical Physics of Solids
- Thesis: Bandstrukturrechnungen und Photoemissionsexperimente an zwischenvalenten Europiumverbindungen (1994)
- Doctoral advisor: Georg Hohlneicher
- Other academic advisors: Arndt Simon; Ole Krogh Andersen; Jean Rouxel

Claudia Anna-Maria Felser (28 July 1962) is a German solid state chemist and materials scientist. She is currently a director of the Max Planck Institute for Chemical Physics of Solids. Felser was elected as a member into the National Academy of Engineering in 2020 for the prediction and discovery of engineered quantum materials ranging from Heusler compounds to topological insulators.

== Education and career ==
Claudia Felser was born in Aachen, Germany in 1962.

Felser studied chemistry and physics at the University of Cologne, completing her diploma in solid state chemistry (1989) and her doctorate in physical chemistry (1994). After postdoctoral fellowships at the Max Planck Institute for Solid State Research in Stuttgart, Germany (1994–1995) with Arndt Simon and Ole Krogh Andersen, she moved to the Centre National de la Recherche Scientifique (CNRS) in Nantes, France (1995–1996), where she worked in the group of Jean Rouxel. Afterwards, she joined the Johannes Gutenberg University of Mainz in 1996 as an assistant professor (C1). She resided there in 2002 and was appointed to a full professor (C4) in 2003.

In 1999, she was a visiting professor at Princeton University and, in 2000, at the University of Caen. From 2009 to 2010 she was a visiting professor at Stanford University and in 2019 visiting professor at Harvard University in the department of Physics/ Applied Physics.

Since September 2011 she is a director of the Max Planck Institute for Chemical Physics of Solids and Professor hon. at the TU Dresden. Since June 2023, Felser has been Vice President of the Max Planck Society (CPT section).

== Research ==
Her initial research interests include Heusler compound and related filled tetrahedral structure types, the design, synthesis and physical investigation of new quantum materials, and materials for energy technologies (solar cells, thermoelectrics, catalysis, spintronics). The physical investigations are executed on bulk material, thin films and artificial superstructures.

Her current research focuses on relativistic materials science. Felser, along with collaborators, developed the field of topological quantum chemistry, which involves the design, synthesis, and realization of new multifunctional materials guided by theory. In particular, she focuses on new materials for quantum technologies such as topological insulators, Weyl and Dirac semimetals, skyrmions, superconductors, new fermions, and new quasiparticles (axions, majorana, parafermions, etc.).

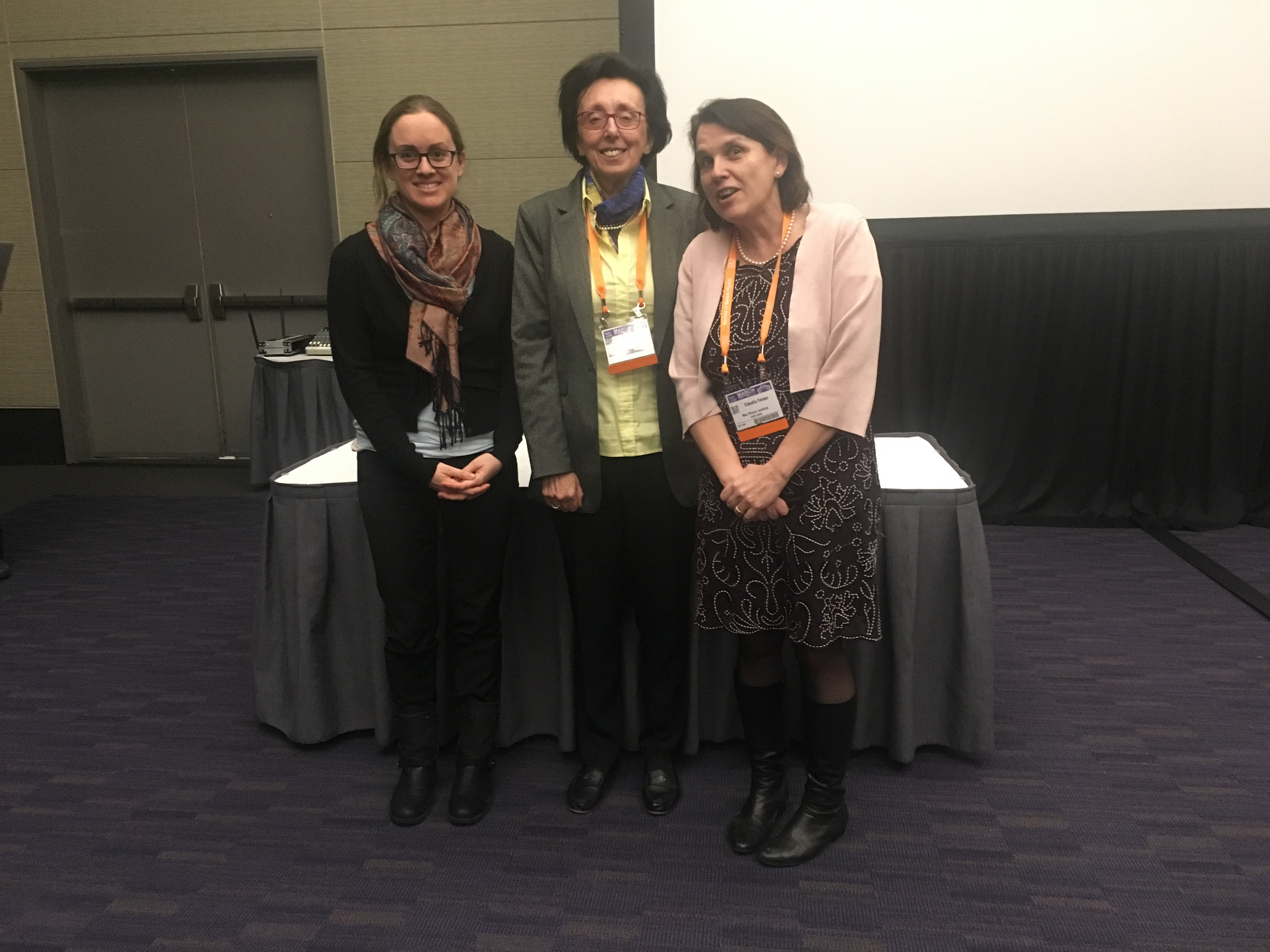
Claudia Felser (pictured right) in March 2019 in Boston, co-recipient of the 2019 James C. McGroddy Prize for New Materials awarded by the American Physical Society (APS). She is accompanied by Julia Mundy & Giulia Galli (in left and in the middle respectively).

== Bibliography ==
Three of her most-cited publications are:

- Graf, Tanja; Felser, Claudia; Parkin, Stuart S.P. (1 May 2011). "Simple rules for the understanding of Heusler compounds". Progress in Solid State Chemistry. 39 (1): 1–50. doi:10.1016/j.progsolidstchem.2011.02.001.
- Shekhar, C.; Nayak, A. K.; Sun, Y.; Schmidt, M.; Leermakers, I.; Zeitler, U.; Skourski, Y.; Felser, C.; Wosnitza, J.; Liu, Z. K.; Chen, Y. L. (1 August 2009). "Extremely large magnetoresistance and ultrahigh mobility in the topological Weyl semimetal candidate NbP". Nature Physics. 11 (8): 645–649. arXiv:1502.04361. doi:10.1038/NPHYS3372. S2CID 119282987.
- Felser, Claudia; Fecher, Gerhard H.; Balke, Benjamin (22 January 2007). "Spintronics: A Challenge for Materials Science and Solid-State Chemistry". Angewandte Chemie International Edition. 46 (5): 668–699. doi:10.1002/anie.200601815. PMID 17219604.

== Awards and honors ==
- 2025: L’Oréal-UNECSO For Woman in Science Award
- 2025: Foreign Member of the Royal Society
- 2024: Von Hippel Award
- 2023: EPS CMD Europhysics Prize
- 2022: Member of the Academy of Sciences and Literature
- 2002: Blaise Pascal Medal of the European Academy of Sciences
- 2022: Liebig Commemorative Medal of the GDCh (Gesellschaft Deutscher Chemiker)
- 2022: Max Born Medal and Prize of the German Physical Society (DPG) and the British Institute of Physics (IOP)
- 2021: International Member of National Academy of Science (NAS), US
- 2020: International Member of National Academy of Engineering (NAE), US
- 2019: APS James C. McGroddy Prize for New Materials with Bernevig and Dai
- 2018: Member of the German National Academy of Sciences Leopoldina
- 2016: Elected fellow of the IEEE (magnetic society)
- 2015: Tsungming Tu Award
- 2014: Alexander M. Cruickshank Lecturer Award
- 2013: Elected American Physical Society (APS) fellow (Division of Condensed Matter Physics)
- 2010: Nakamura Lecture Award of the University of California Santa Barbara
- 2001: Order of Merit (Landesverdienstorden) of the federal state Rhineland-Palatinate for the foundation of the first NAT-LAB for school students at the University Mainz with a focus in female school students

She is the chairwoman of a German Research Foundation research group. She was a member of the 13th Bundesversammlung (Germany).

== Personal life ==
Claudia Felser is married to the physicist Stuart S. P. Parkin. She has one daughter.
