= Arndt Simon =

German inorganic chemist

- Education: University of Münster
- Awards: 1972 Chemistry Award of the Göttingen Academy of Sciences and Humanities, 1985 Wilhelm Klemm Award of the Society of German Chemists, 1987 Otto Bayer Award, 1990 Gottfried Wilhelm Leibniz Prize, 1998 Centenary Prize, Royal Society of Chemistry, 2004 Liebig-Denkmünze of the Society of German Chemists, 2011 Terrae Rarae Award
- Scientific career
- Workplaces: University of Münster, Max Planck Institute for Solid State Research in Stuttgart
- Doctoral advisor: Harald Schäfer
- Doctoral students: Richard Dronskowski
- Other notable students: Claudia Felser

Arndt Simon (born 14 January 1940) is a German inorganic chemist. He was a director at the Max Planck Institute for Solid State Research in Stuttgart.

== Life ==
Simon studied Chemistry at the University of Münster from 1960–1964. He worked on his doctoral thesis in the group of Harald Schäfer from 1964–1966 and finished his habilitation in 1971. In 1972, he was appointed as an associate professor at the University of Münster. Starting in 1974, he was a member of the Max-Planck Society and one of the directors at the Max Planck Institute for Solid State Research in Stuttgart. Since 1975, he was an honorary professor at the University of Stuttgart. Since 2010, he has been an emeritus.

== Research ==
Simon worked on a wide range of topics in inorganic chemistry:

- Alkali Metal Suboxides
- Subnitrides of Alkaline Earth Metals
- Metal-rich Halides and Oxides of Heavy d-Metals
- Condensed Clusters
- Interstitial Atoms in Metal Clusters
- Metalrich Binary and Ternary Halides of Lanthanides
- Thorium Cluster Compounds
- Intermetallic Compounds (Pauling-Simon Rule)
- Structures and Phase Transitions in Molecular Crystals
- Structure Property Relations (Photo Cathodes, Amorphous Metals, Magnetic Order and Frustration, Spin Crossover, Spin Glasses)
- Superconductivity
- Apparatus Development (Guinier-Simon Camera, Area Detector Diffractometer)

== Awards ==
Simon was awarded a number of awards and honorary doctorates:

- 1972 Chemistry Award of the Göttingen Academy of Sciences and Humanities
- 1985 Wilhelm Klemm Award of the Society of German Chemists
- 1987 Otto Bayer Award
- 1990 Gottfried Wilhelm Leibniz Prize
- 1998 Dr. rer.nat. h.c. of Technical University Dresden
- 1998 Dr. rer.nat. h.c. of University (TH) Karlsruhe
- 1998 Centenary Prize, Royal Society of Chemistry
- 2001 Dr. phil. h.c. of Stockholm University
- 2002 Dr. h.c. of Université de Rennes I
- 2004 Sir Nevill Mott Lecture, University of Loughborough
- 2004 Liebig-Denkmünze of the Society of German Chemists
- 2011 Terrae Rarae Award

He is also a member of several academies of sciences:

- 1989 Member of the Academy of Sciences and Literature Mainz (Corresponding Member since 1994)
- 1990 Member of the Heidelberg Academy of Sciences and Humanities
- 1990 Member of the Academia Europaea
- 1992 Member of the Russian Academy of Sciences
- 1998 Member of the Academy of Sciences Leopoldina
- 1998 Foreign Member of the French Academy of Sciences
- 2003 Honorary Fellow of the Chemical Research Society of India
