= Lorenz Cederbaum =

German chemist (born 1946)

Lorenz S. Cederbaum (born 26 October 1946 in Braunschweig, Germany) is a German physical chemist.

He studied physics at LMU Munich and obtained his diploma in 1970, his Ph.D. in 1972 under Georg Hohlneicher, and habilitation in 1976. He was professor at the University of Freiburg before becoming professor for theoretical chemistry at Heidelberg University in 1979.

Cederbaum is member of the International Academy of Quantum Molecular Science and the Academy of Sciences Leopoldina.

== Research areas ==
- Calculation of electronic states and transitions using many-particle methods (computational chemistry)
- Spectroscopy and radiationless relaxation of polyatomic molecules
- Electron-molecule scattering, photoionization and Auger decay
- Wave packet dynamics (the multi-configuration time-dependent Hartree method).
- Chaos and statistics
- Structure and dynamics of quasi-one-dimensional systems
- Stable multiply charged anions of isolated small molecules and clusters
- Fundamental aspects, electronic structure and dynamics of atoms and molecules in strong magnetic fields
- Bose-Einstein Condensation
- Interatomic/Intermolecular Coulombic Decay (ICD)
