= Judy Cha =

American physicist and academic

- Education: Cornell University; Simon Fraser University
- Scientific career
- Workplaces: Cornell University; Yale University; Stanford University
- Doctoral advisor: David A Muller
- Other academic advisors: Yi Cui

Judy Jeeyong Cha is an American physicist who is a Professor of Materials Science and Engineering at Cornell University. Her research considers 2D materials for next-generation technologies, including quantum computing and low-dissipation electronics.

== Early life and education ==
Cha grew up in South Korea. She has said that she loved mathematics and science as a child. She was an undergraduate student in engineering physics at Simon Fraser University. She earned her doctorate at Cornell University, where she worked with David A Muller and developed nanoscale electron spectroscopies. Cha was a postdoctoral researcher at Stanford University. She worked with Yi Cui on 2D materials, and became interested in topological systems. The topological systems developed by Cha can be used to control electron transport and spin.

== Research and career ==
Cha joined the faculty at Yale University in 2013, where she was one of the first faculty appointed to the Energy Sciences Institute, and eventually made the Carol and Douglas Melamed Professor. She moved to Cornell University in 2022, where she built a laboratory that fabricates and characterizes 2D nanomaterials. She is particularly interested in phase transformations and structure-property relationships in chalcogonides. She has developed new strategies to create superconducting and metallic nanowires, which hold promise for quantum computation, and in situ approaches for transmission electron microscopy.

== Awards and honors ==
- 2016 Yale Arthur Greer Memorial Prize
- 2017 Canadian Institute for Advanced Research Azrieli Global Scholar for Quantum Materials
- 2018 National Science Foundation CAREER Award
- 2019 Moore Foundation EPiQS Materials Synthesis Investigator Award
- 2024 Fellow of the American Physical Society "for pioneering contributions in the development of nanoscale synthesis and characterization methods for topological nanomaterials, resulting in enhanced properties of the topological electronic states for device applications and fundamental studies"

== Selected publications ==
- Ganesh R Bhimanapati; Zhong Lin; Meunier, Vincent; et al. (2015). "Recent Advances in Two-Dimensional Materials beyond Graphene". ACS Nano. 9 (12): 11509–11539. doi:10.1021/acsnano.5b05556. PMID 26544756. Wikidata Q38627034.
- Desheng Kong; Haotian Wang; Judy J Cha; Mauro Pasta; Kristie J Koski; Jie Yao; Yi Cui (2013). "Synthesis of MoS2 and MoSe2 films with vertically aligned layers". Nano Letters. 13 (3): 1341–1347. doi:10.1021/nl400258t. PMID 23387444. Wikidata Q46943362.
- Zhi Wei Seh; Weiyang Li; Judy J Cha; Guangyuan Zheng; Yuan Yang; Matthew T McDowell; Po-Chun Hsu; Yi Cui (2013). "Sulphur-TiO2 yolk-shell nanoarchitecture with internal void space for long-cycle lithium-sulphur batteries". Nature Communications. 4: 1331. Bibcode:2013NatCo...4.1331W. doi:10.1038/ncomms2327. PMID 23299881. Wikidata Q34321581.

== Personal life ==
Cha is married to Alex Kwan, a psychiatrist who is a professor in the Meinig School of Biomedical Engineering.
