= Von Hippel Award =

Materials science award

The Von Hippel Award is the highest scientific honor of the Materials Research Society in memory of Arthur R. von Hippel. It has been awarded annually since 1978, with von Hippel himself being the first recipient in 1976.

The award in the field of interdisciplinary materials science is endowed with $10,000. Recipients also receive honorary membership in the Materials Research Society and are expected to give a lecture at the opening of the respective fall meeting of the society.

== Recipients ==
- 1976 Arthur R. von Hippel, Massachusetts Institute of Technology
- 1978 William O. Baker, Bell Laboratories
- 1979 David Turnbull, Harvard University
- 1980 Conyers Herring, Stanford University
- 1981 James W. Mayer, Cornell University
- 1982 Clarence Melvin Zener, Carnegie Mellon University
- 1983 Peter B. Hirsch, University of Oxford
- 1984 Walter L. Brown, AT&T Bell Laboratories
- 1985 John W. Cahn, National Bureau of Standards
- 1986 Minko Balkanski, Université Pierre et Marie Curie
- 1987 Frederick Charles Frank, University of Bristol
- 1988 Jacques Friedel, Université de Paris-Sud
- 1989 John B. Goodenough, The University of Texas, Austin
- 1990 Robert W. Balluffi, Massachusetts Institute of Technology
- 1991 Theodore Geballe, Stanford University
- 1992 Michael F. Ashby, University of Cambridge
- 1993 Frederick Seitz, The Rockefeller University
- 1994 Alfred Y. Cho, AT&T Bell Laboratories
- 1995 William W. Mullins, Carnegie Mellon University
- 1996 Alan Cottrell, University of Cambridge
- 1997 Gábor A. Somorjai, University of California, Berkeley
- 1998 Larry L. Hench, Imperial College of Science, Technology and Medicine
- 1999 Richard S. Stein, University of Massachusetts, Amherst
- 2000 George Whitesides, Harvard University
- 2001 Simon C. Moss, University of Houston
- 2002 Howard K. Birnbaum, University of Illinois
- 2003 Julia R. Weertman, Northwestern University
- 2004 Nick Holonyak, Jr., University of Illinois, Urbana-Champaign
- 2005 Robert Langer, Massachusetts Institute of Technology
- 2006 Knut Urban, Forschungszentrum Jülich
- 2007 William D. Nix, Stanford University
- 2008 Herbert Gleiter, Forschungszentrum Karlsruhe
- 2009 Tobin Marks, Northwestern University
- 2010 L. Eric Cross, The Pennsylvania State University
- 2011 A. Paul Alivisatos, Lawrence Berkeley National Laboratory und University of California, Berkeley
- 2012 Stuart Parkin, IBM Almaden Research Center
- 2013 Mildred S. Dresselhaus, Massachusetts Institute of Technology
- 2014 Marvin L. Cohen, University of California, Berkeley
- 2015 Richard Friend, University of Cambridge
- 2016 Charles M. Lieber, Harvard University
- 2017 C. N. R. Rao, Jawaharlal Nehru Centre for Advanced Scientific Research
- 2018 Hideo Hosono, Tokyo Institute of Technology
- 2019 Jerry Tersoff, IBM T. J. Watson Research Center
- 2020 Cato T. Laurencin, University of Connecticut
- 2021 Harry Atwater, California Institute of Technology
- 2022 Samuel Stupp, Northwestern University
- 2023 Reshef Tenne, Weizmann Institute of Science
- 2024 Claudia Felser, Max Planch Institute for Chemical Physics of Solids
- 2025 Omar M. Yaghi, University of California, Berkeley
