= Richard Dronskowski =

German chemist and physicist

Richard Dronskowski (born 11 November 1961, in Brilon) is a German chemist and physicist. He is a full professor at the RWTH Aachen University.

== Life ==
Dronskowski studied chemistry and physics at the University of Münster from 1981 to 1986. He completed his chemistry diploma with Bernt Krebs and Arndt Simon in 1987. He finished his physics diploma with Ole Krogh Andersen and Johannes Pollmann in 1989. He received his doctorate under supervision of Arndt Simon at the University of Stuttgart. From 1991 to 1992, he was a visiting scientist in the group of Roald Hoffmann at Cornell University. In 1995, he finished his habilitation at the University of Dortmund. Since 1997, he is a full professor at the RWTH Aachen University.

== Research ==
His research focuses on the following topics:

- solid-state chemistry
- quantum chemistry
- nitrides
- carbodiimides
- guanidinates
- intermetallics
- steel
- phase-change materials
- chemical bonding (e.g., Crystal Orbital Hamilton Populations)
- ab initio thermochemistry
- structural chemistry
- neutron diffraction

== Awards ==
- 1990 Otto Hahn Medal (Max Planck Society)
- 1996 Prize of Angewandte Chemie
- 1997 Chemistry Lecturer Prize (Fonds der chemischen Industrie)
- 2014 Distinguished Professorship (RWTH Aachen University)
- 2015 Innovation Award (RWTH Aachen University)
- 2017 Egon Wiberg Lecture (LMU Munich)

== Selected publications ==
- Dronskowski, Richard; Bloechl, Peter E. (1993). "Crystal orbital Hamilton populations (COHP): energy-resolved visualization of chemical bonding in solids based on density-functional calculations". The Journal of Physical Chemistry. 97 (33). American Chemical Society (ACS): 8617–8624. doi:10.1021/j100135a014. ISSN 0022-3654.
- Landrum, Gregory A.; Dronskowski, Richard (2 May 2000). "The Orbital Origins of Magnetism: From Atoms to Molecules to Ferromagnetic Alloys". Angewandte Chemie International Edition. 39 (9). Wiley: 1560–1585. doi:10.1002/(sici)1521-3773(20000502)39:9<1560::aid-anie1560>3.0.co;2-t. ISSN 1433-7851. PMID 10820443.
- Liu, Xiaohui; Krott, Manuel; Müller, Paul; Hu, Chunhua; Lueken, Heiko; Dronskowski, Richard (5 April 2005). "Synthesis, Crystal Structure, and Properties of MnNCN, the First Carbodiimide of a Magnetic Transition Metal". Inorganic Chemistry. 44 (9). American Chemical Society (ACS): 3001–3003. doi:10.1021/ic050050a. ISSN 0020-1669. PMID 15847401.
- Wuttig, Matthias; Lüsebrink, Daniel; Wamwangi, Daniel; Wełnic, Wojciech; Gilleßen, Michael; Dronskowski, Richard (17 December 2006). "The role of vacancies and local distortions in the design of new phase-change materials". Nature Materials. 6 (2). Springer Science and Business Media LLC: 122–128. doi:10.1038/nmat1807. ISSN 1476-1122. PMID 17173032.
- Dronskowski, Richard (2005). Computational chemistry of solid state materials : a guide for materials scientists, chemists, physicists and others. Weinheim Germany: Wiley-VCH. ISBN 978-3-527-61227-7. OCLC 184983810.
- Stoffel, Ralf Peter; Wessel, Claudia; Lumey, Marck-Willem; Dronskowski, Richard (22 June 2010). "Ab Initio Thermochemistry of Solid-State Materials". Angewandte Chemie International Edition. 49 (31). Wiley: 5242–5266. doi:10.1002/anie.200906780. ISSN 1433-7851. PMID 20572215.
- Deringer, Volker L.; Tchougréeff, Andrei L.; Dronskowski, Richard (6 May 2011). "Crystal Orbital Hamilton Population (COHP) Analysis As Projected from Plane-Wave Basis Sets". The Journal of Physical Chemistry A. 115 (21). American Chemical Society (ACS): 5461–5466. Bibcode:2011JPCA..115.5461D. doi:10.1021/jp202489s. ISSN 1089-5639. PMID 21548594.
- Sawinski, Peter Klaus; Meven, Martin; Englert, Ulli; Dronskowski, Richard (1 March 2013). "Single-Crystal Neutron Diffraction Study on Guanidine, CN3H5". Crystal Growth & Design. 13 (4). American Chemical Society (ACS): 1730–1735. doi:10.1021/cg400054k. ISSN 1528-7483.
- Deringer, Volker L.; Stoffel, Ralf P.; Togo, Atsushi; Eck, Bernhard; Meven, Martin; Dronskowski, Richard (21 October 2014). "Ab initio ORTEP drawings: a case study of N-based molecular crystals with different chemical nature". CrystEngComm. 16 (47). Royal Society of Chemistry (RSC): 10907–10915. doi:10.1039/c4ce01637h. ISSN 1466-8033.
- Missong, Ronja; George, Janine; Houben, Andreas; Hoelzel, Markus; Dronskowski, Richard (26 August 2015). "Synthesis, Structure, and Properties of SrC(NH)3, a Nitrogen-Based Carbonate Analogue with the Trinacria Motif". Angewandte Chemie International Edition. 54 (41). Wiley: 12171–12175. doi:10.1002/anie.201507113. ISSN 1433-7851. PMID 26308739.
- Liu, Xiaohui; George, Janine; Maintz, Stefan; Dronskowski, Richard (17 December 2014). "β-CuN3: The Overlooked Ground-State Polymorph of Copper Azide with Heterographene-Like Layers". Angewandte Chemie International Edition. 54 (6). Wiley: 1954–1959. doi:10.1002/anie.201410987. ISSN 1433-7851. PMID 25522245. S2CID 37257409.
- Jacobs, Philipp; Houben, Andreas; Schweika, Werner; Tchougréeff, Andrei L.; Dronskowski, Richard (13 October 2015). "A Rietveld refinement method for angular- and wavelength-dispersive neutron time-of-flight powder diffraction data". Journal of Applied Crystallography. 48 (6). International Union of Crystallography (IUCr): 1627–1636. Bibcode:2015JApCr..48.1627J. doi:10.1107/s1600576715016520. ISSN 1600-5767. PMC 4665658. PMID 26664340.
- Sougrati, Moulay T.; Darwiche, Ali; Liu, Xiaohiu; Mahmoud, Abdelfattah; Hermann, Raphael P.; Jouen, Samuel; Monconduit, Laure; Dronskowski, Richard; Stievano, Lorenzo (16 March 2016). "Transition-Metal Carbodiimides as Molecular Negative Electrode Materials for Lithium- and Sodium-Ion Batteries with Excellent Cycling Properties". Angewandte Chemie International Edition. 55 (16). Wiley: 5090–5095. doi:10.1002/anie.201600098. ISSN 1433-7851. OSTI 1261390. PMID 26989882.
- Maintz, Stefan; Deringer, Volker L.; Tchougréeff, Andrei L.; Dronskowski, Richard (24 February 2016). "LOBSTER: A tool to extract chemical bonding from plane-wave based DFT". Journal of Computational Chemistry. 37 (11). Wiley: 1030–1035. doi:10.1002/jcc.24300. ISSN 0192-8651. PMC 5067632. PMID 26914535.
- Dronskowski, Richard (2017). Handbook of solid state chemistry. Weinheim, Germany: Wiley-VCH. ISBN 978-3-527-32587-0. OCLC 988580859.
