= Stuart Parkin =

British physicist

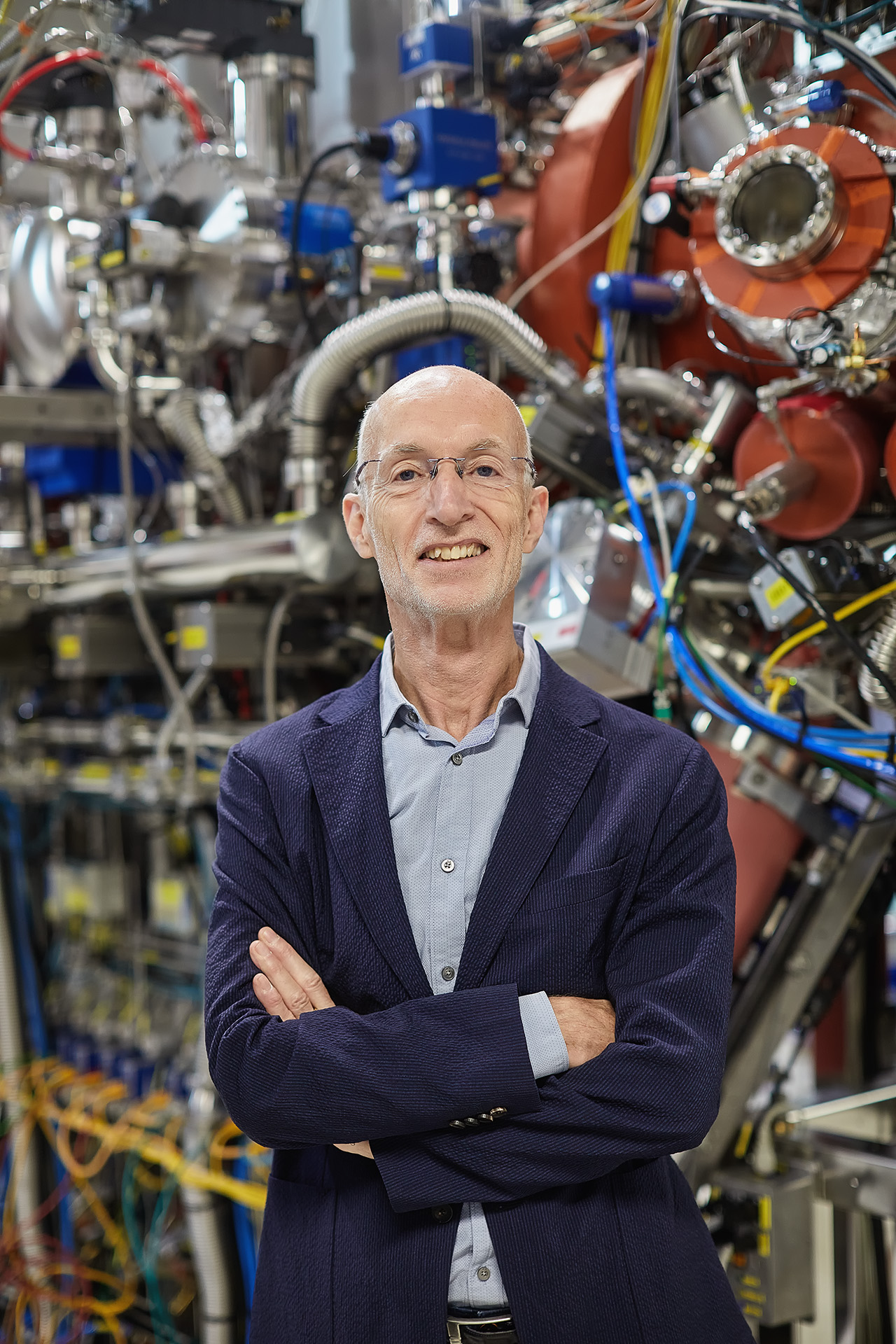
- Stuart S. P. Parkin at the Max Planck Institute of Microstructure Physics
- Born: Stuart Stephen Papworth Parkin; 9 December 1955 (age 70); Watford, England
- Education: University of Cambridge
- Known for: Discoveries on spintronic materials, that allowed a 1000-fold increase in hard disk data density. Racetrack memory (RTM)
- Spouse: Claudia Felser
- Awards: Europhysics Prize (1997); Humboldt Research Award (2004); Dresden Barkhausen Award (2009); IUPAP Magnetism Award and Néel Medal (2009); David Adler Lectureship Award (2012); Von Hippel Award (2012); Swan Medal and Prize (2013); Millennium Technology Prize (2014); King Faisal Prize (2021); Clarivate Citation Laureate (2023); APS Medal (2024); Draper Prize (2024)
- Scientific career
- Fields: Material sciences spintronics
- Workplaces: Max Planck Institute of Microstructure Physics; University of Halle-Wittenberg; Stanford University; IBM Research

Stuart Stephen Papworth Parkin (born 9 December 1955) is an experimental physicist, Managing Director at the Max Planck Institute of Microstructure Physics in Halle and an Alexander von Humboldt Professor at the Institute of Physics of the Martin-Luther-University Halle-Wittenberg.

He is a pioneer in the science and application of spintronic materials, and has made discoveries into the behaviour of thin-film magnetic structures that were critical in enabling recent increases in the data density and capacity of computer hard-disk drives. For these discoveries, he was awarded the 2014 Millennium Technology Prize.

Before his current position, Parkin was an IBM Fellow and manager of the magnetoelectronics group at the IBM Almaden Research Center in San Jose, California. He was also a consulting professor in the department of applied physics at Stanford University and director of the IBM-Stanford Spintronic Science and Applications Center, which was formed in 2004.

== Education and early life ==
A native of Watford, England, Parkin received his B.A. (1977) and was elected a research fellow (1979) at Trinity College, Cambridge, England, and was awarded his PhD (1980) at the Cavendish Laboratory, also in Cambridge. He joined IBM in 1982 as a World Trade Post-doctoral Fellow, becoming a permanent member of the staff the following year. In 1999 he was named an IBM Fellow, IBM's highest technical honour.

== Research and career ==
In 2007 Parkin was named a distinguished visiting professor at the National University of Singapore, a visiting chair professor at the National Taiwan University, and an honorary visiting professor at University College London. In 2008, he was elected to the National Academy of Sciences. The Materials Research Network Dresden granted him the Dresden Barkhausen Award in 2009. Parkin has been awarded honorary doctorates by the University of Aachen, Germany in 2007, the Eindhoven University of Technology, The Netherlands in 2008, the University of Regensburg, Germany in 2011 and the University of Kaiserslautern, Germany in 2013.

In 1989 Stuart Parkin discovered the phenomenon of oscillatory interlayer coupling in magnetic multilayers, by which magnetic layers are magnetically coupled via an intervening non-magnetic metallic spacer layer. Parkin found that the sign of the exchange coupling oscillates from ferromagnetic to antiferromagnetic with an oscillation period of just a few atomic layers. Remarkably, Parkin discovered this phenomenon in thin film magnetic heterostructures that he prepared in a simple home-made sputtering system. Parkin, moreover, showed that this phenomenon is displayed by almost all metallic transition elements. In what is often referred to as "Parkin's Periodic Table", Parkin showed that the strength of this oscillatory interlayer exchange interaction varied systematically across the Periodic Table of the elements. Parkin made numerous other fundamental discoveries which continued the development of the field of "spintronics" of which he is recognised as a prolific scientist.

Later Parkin improved magnetic tunnelling junctions, a device invented in the 1970s by Julliere, and revolutionized by Jagadeesh Moodera of MIT. This element can create a high performance magnetic random access memory in 1995. Magnetoresistive random-access memory (MRAM) promises unique attributes of high speed, high density and non-volatility. The development by Parkin in 2001 of giant tunnelling magnetoresistance in magnetic tunnel junctions using highly textured MgO tunnel barriers has made MRAM even more promising. IBM developed the first MRAM prototype in 1999 and is currently developing a 16 Mbit chip.

Parkin's research interests include organic superconductors, high-temperature superconductors, and, most recently, magnetic thin film structures and spintronic materials and devices for advanced sensor, memory, and logic applications. Most recently, Parkin has proposed and is working on a novel storage class memory device, The Magnetic Racetrack memory, which could replace both hard disk drives and many forms of conventional solid state memory. His research interests also include spin transistors and spin-logic devices that may enable a new generation of low-power electronics.

Parkin has received two ERC Advanced Grants: The first was awarded in 2014 and focused on spin-orbitronics for electronic technologies ("SORBET"). The second was awarded in 2022, focusing on the interplay between chirality, spin textures and superconductivity at manufactured interfaces ("SUPERMINT").

Parkin has authored over 670 papers and has more than 123 issued patents. Clarivate has named Parkin a "Highly Cited Researcher in the field of Physics" for the years 2018–2022. He is also the chief editor of Spin, one of World Scientific's newest journals, which publishes articles in spin electronics.

== Personal life ==
Parkin is married to the chemist Claudia Felser, who herself is director of the Max Planck Institute for Chemical Physics of Solids in Dresden.

== Awards ==
Parkin is the recipient of numerous honours, including the Gutenberg Research Award (2008), a Humboldt Research Award (2004), the 1999–2000 American Institute of Physics Prize for Industrial Applications of Physics, the European Physical Society's Europhysics Prize (1997), the American Physical Society's International New Materials Prize (1994), the MRS Outstanding Young Investigator Award (1991) and the Charles Vernon Boys Prize from the Institute of Physics, London (1991). In 2001, he was named the first "Innovator of the Year" by R&D Magazine and in October 2007 was received the "No Boundaries" Award for Innovation from The Economist. The IEEE Daniel E. Noble Award for Emerging Technologies was awarded to Parkin in 2008. In 2009, Parkin was elected as a Fellow of the American Academy of Art and Sciences and received the IUPAP Magnetism Award and Néel Medal of the International Union of Pure and Applied Physics. In 2012, Parkin was awarded the Von Hippel Award of the Materials Research Society as well as the David Adler Lectureship Award in the Field of Materials Physics. In April 2014, Parkin was awarded the Millennium Technology Prize for his work on spintronic materials, "leading to a prodigious growth in the capacity to store digital information". In 2021 he received the King Faisal Prize in Science. In 2023, Parkin was named a Clarivate Citation Laureate in Physics, an award given out to scientists considered likely to receive a Nobel Prize in the future. Parkin received the 2024 APS Medal for Exceptional Achievement in Research for contributions to spintronics and data storage. Parkin was awarded the Charles Stark Draper Prize in 2024 for his "inventions in the field of spintronics".

== Memberships ==
Parkin is a Fellow of the Royal Society, the American Physical Society, the Materials Research Society, the Institute of Physics (London), the Institute of Electrical and Electronics Engineers, the American Association for the Advancement of Science, and the Gutenberg Research College (GRC).

In 2008, Parkin was elected a member of the National Academy of Sciences. In 2009, he was elected into the National Academy of Engineering for contributions to development of spin-engineered magnetic heterostructures for magnetic sensors and memory devices. In 2012, he was elected into The World Academy of Sciences. The same year, he received an Honorary fellowship of the Indian Academy of Sciences. In 2015, he became a member of the German Academy of Sciences Leopoldina. Since March 2016, Parkin is an International Fellow of the Royal Society of Edinburgh, Scotland's national academy of science and letters. In 2019, he became a fellow of the Royal Academy of Engineering.

| Preceded by Linus Torvalds; Shinya Yamanaka | Millennium Technology Prize winner 2014 | Succeeded by Frances Arnold |
