= Howard Kent Birnbaum =

American metallurgist

Howard Kent Birnbaum (18 October 1932 Brooklyn, New York – 23 January 2005 Urbana, Illinois) was an American metallurgist who was well known due to his works on the interaction of point, linear and planar defects in plastic deformation of materials.

He received his BS in 1953 and MS in 1955 from Columbia University. In 1958 he received his PhD in metallurgy from University of Illinois at Urbana–Champaign. In 1958 he started teaching at the University of Chicago and joined University of Illinois in 1961.

== Awards ==
- Guggenheim Fellowship – 1967
- Robert Franklin Mehl Gold Medal – The Metallurgical Society, American Institute of Mining, Metallurgical and Petroleum Engineers – 1986
- Von Hippel Award – Materials Research Society – 2002
