= Harald Schäfer =

German chemist (1913–1992)

Harald Schäfer (10 February 1913, Jena – 21 December 1992, Münster) was a professor of inorganic chemistry at the University of Münster in Germany. He is recognized for popularizing the use of chemical vapor transport and the discovery of many new inorganic compounds.

Schäfer began his studies in 1937 and was awarded a doctorate in 1940. His dissertation was on analytical chemistry of boron. He conducted his habilitation at the Technical University of Stuttgart on iron oxychlorides, during which he discovered the phenomenon of chemical vapor transport (migration in the solid state via the gas phase).

In recognition of his research achievements, he was awarded the Alfred Stock Memorial Prize in 1967. He was also elected to the Leopoldina Academy.
