= Max Planck Institute for Chemical Physics of Solids =

Research institute in Dresden, Germany

- Max-Planck-Institut für Chemische Physik fester Stoffe
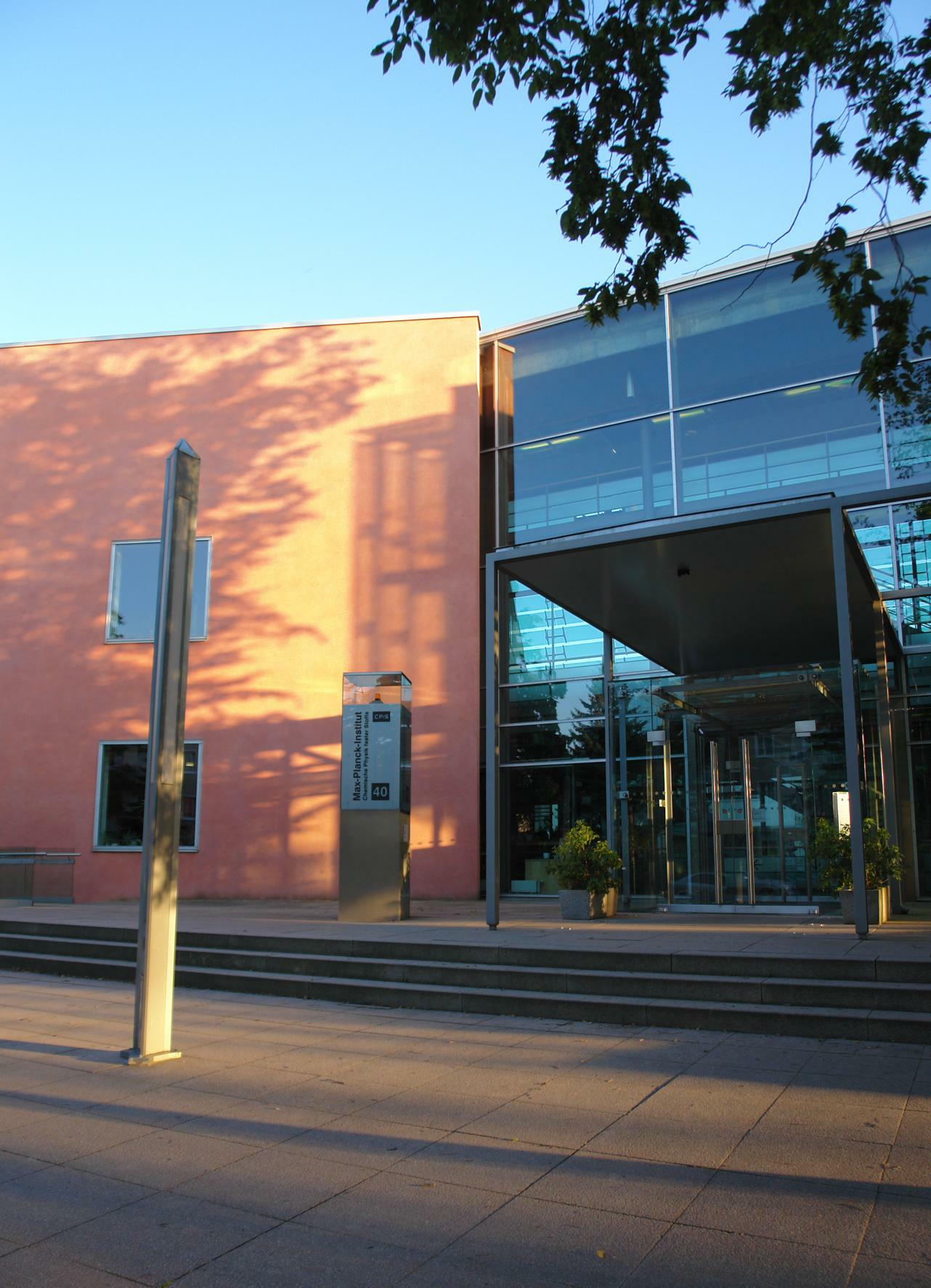
- Abbreviation: MPL
- Formation: 1995; 31 years ago
- Type: Scientific institute
- Purpose: Research in physics and chemistry
- Headquarters: Dresden, Germany
- Coordinates: 51°1′35″N 13°43′7″E
- Key people: Claudia Felser
- Parent organization: Max Planck Society
- Staff: 200
- Website: cpfs.mpg.de

The Max Planck Institute for Chemical Physics of Solids (MPI CPfS) (German: Max-Planck-Institut für Chemische Physik fester Stoffe) is a research institute of the Max Planck Society. Located in Dresden, Germany, the institute primarily conducts basic research in the natural sciences in the fields of physics and chemistry.

MPI CpfS is divided into four departments, each headed by a senior researcher:

- Chemical Metals Science (CMS), headed by Juri Grin
- Topological Quantum Chemistry (TQC), headed by Claudia Felser
- Physics of Correlated Matter (PCM), headed by Liu Hao Tjeng
- Physics of Quantum Materials (PQM), headed by Andrew P. Mackenzie

Each of these departments consist of multiple individual research groups headed by group leaders.

== Mission ==
The MPI CPfS conducts research on modern solid state chemistry and physics. Key open questions include "understanding the interplay of topology and symmetry in modern materials, maximising the level of control in material synthesis, understanding the nature of the chemical bond in intermetallic compounds and studying giant response functions at the borderline of standard metallic and superconducting behaviour".
