= David A Muller =

Physicist

David Anthony Muller
- Born: South Africa
- Education: Cornell University; University of Sydney
- Known for: Electron Microscopy
- Awards: APS Fellow; MSA Fellow; Burton Medal (2006); Duncumb Award (2016); Ernst Ruska Prize (2021); John Cowley Medal (2023); APS Keithley Award (2024); National Academy of Engineering (2026)
- Scientific career
- Workplaces: Cornell University; Bell Labs

David Muller is a named Professor in the School of Applied and Engineering Physics at Cornell University and co-director of the Kavli Institute at Cornell for Nanoscale Science. He is known for his work in electron microscopy, condensed matter physics, and discovery of atomic structure across a wide range of materials including applications in clean energy research, semiconductor devices, and 2D materials. He is a fellow in the American Physical Society and the Microscopy Society of America and received the MSA Burton Medal, the MAS Duncumb Award, the Ernst Ruska Prize of the German Society for Electron Microscopy, and the APS Keithley Award for advances in measurement science. He is a member of the National Academy of Engineering and is twice in the Guinness World Records, most recently, for achieving the highest resolution microscope image ever recorded using electron ptychography. His work spans theory, computation, and experimental physics research. He is also a Faculty member of the Center for Bright Beams.

== Selected publications ==
- Muller, David (2018). "Electron Ptychography of 2D Materials to Deep Sub-Ångström Resolution". Nature. 559 (7714): 343–349. arXiv:1801.04630. Bibcode:2018Natur.559..343J. doi:10.1038/s41586-018-0298-5. PMID 30022131. S2CID 256768404.
- Muller, David (2021). "Electron ptychography achieves atomic-resolution limits set by lattice vibrations". Science. 372 (6544): 826–831. arXiv:2101.00465. Bibcode:2021Sci...372..826C. doi:10.1126/science.abg2533. PMID 34016774. S2CID 230435950.
- Muller, David (2011). "Grains and grain boundaries in single-layer graphene atomic patchwork quilts". Nature. 469 (7330): 389–92. arXiv:1009.4714. Bibcode:2011Natur.469..389H. doi:10.1038/nature09718. PMID 21209615. S2CID 205223553.
