= Giulia Galli =

American condensed-matter physicist

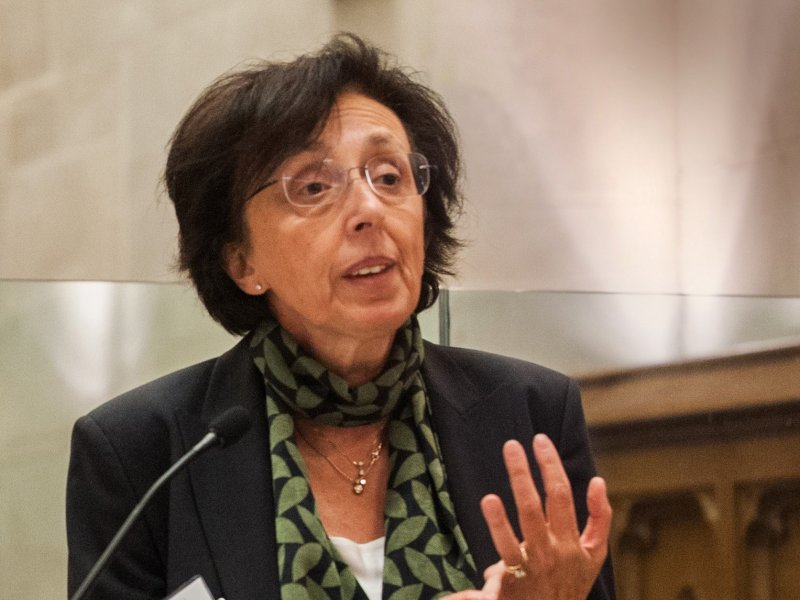
- Education: International School for Advanced Studies
- Awards: Member of the National Academy Sciences; Member of the American Academy of Arts and Sciences; Fellow of the American Physical Society; Fellow of the American Association for the Advancement of Science; 2019 Feynman prize for Theory
- Scientific career
- Fields: Physics; Chemistry; Materials Science; Molecular Engineering
- Workplaces: University of Chicago

Giulia Galli is a condensed-matter physicist. She is the Liew Family Professor of Electronic Structure and Simulations in the Pritzker School of Molecular Engineering and the department of chemistry at the University of Chicago and senior scientist at Argonne National Laboratory. She is also the director of the Midwest Integrated Center for Computational Materials. She is recognized for her contributions to the fields of computational condensed-matter, materials science, and nanoscience, most notably first principles simulations of materials and liquids, in particular materials for energy, properties of water, and excited state phenomena.

== Education ==
Galli earned her PhD in physics in 1987 from the International School for Advanced Studies in Trieste, Italy. She held postdoctoral fellowships at the University of Illinois at Urbana-Champaign with Richard Martin, and the IBM Research Division in Zurich, Switzerland.

== Career ==
Galli joined the Swiss Federal Institute of Technology (EPFL) in Lausanne, Switzerland, in 1991 first as senior researcher and then as senior scientist. She moved to Lawrence Livermore National Laboratory in Livermore, California in 1998, where she was the founding group leader of the Quantum Simulations Group that she led until 2005. From 2005 to 2013, Galli was professor of chemistry and physics at University of California, Davis. While at UC Davis, she was the chair of Deep Carbon Observatory's Extreme Physics and Chemistry Directorate. In 2013 she joined the University of Chicago's Institute for Molecular Engineering (now Pritzker School of Molecular Engineering) as Liew Family Professor of Electronic Structure and Simulations. She is also professor of chemistry at the University of Chicago and senior scientist at Argonne National Laboratory. She is the director of the Midwest Integrated Center for Computational Materials (MICCoM), which develops and disseminates interoperable open source software, data and validation procedures for the simulation and prediction of functional materials. MICCoM was established by the Department of Energy in 2015 and renewed in 2019 and 2023.

== Research and achievements ==
Galli's research activity focuses on the development and use of computational methods to understand and predict the behavior of solids, liquids and nanostructures from first principles. Galli pioneered the application of first principles molecular dynamics to heterogeneous materials and liquids and she developed methods for computational spectroscopy, including electronic and vibrational spectroscopies. Her theoretical studies of excited state properties of matter focus on the prediction of optimal systems for harvesting sunlight and on the properties of water resources at ambient conditions and in severe environments. Another area of active interest is the study of phenomena and materials used to realize quantum information technologies. Galli's software activities are focused on the development of the WEST code (large-scale electronic structure within many-body perturbation theory) and participation in the development of the Qbox code (ab initio molecular dynamics) led by Francois Gygi at University of California, Davis, both of which are supported by MICCoM.

== Honors and awards ==
- 2026: Appointed CNRS Fellow Ambassador
- 2025: Bernie Alder CECAM Prize
- 2024: Joseph O. Hirschfelder Prize in Theoretical Chemistry
- 2022: Lifetime Achievement Award, Italian Scientists in North America Foundation
- 2022: Aneesur Rahman Prize for Computational Physics (American Physical Society)
- 2021: Elected member of the International Academy of Quantum Molecular Science
- 2020: Elected member of the National Academy of Sciences (USA)
- 2020: Elected member of the American Academy of Arts and Sciences
- 2020: Impact Argonne Award (Argonne National Laboratory)
- 2019: Medal of the Schola Physica Romana and Tommasoni-Chisesi prize
- 2019: Feynman Theory Prize (Foresight Institute)
- 2019: David Adler Lectureship Award in the Field of Materials Physics (APS)
- 2019: Nelson W. Taylor Lecture Award (Penn State University)
- 2018: Materials Research Society Theory Award (MRS)
- 2013: Fellow of the American Association for the Advancement of Science
- 2005: Lawrence Livermore National Laboratory (LLNL) Science and Technology Award
- 2004: Lawrence Livermore National Laboratory (LLNL) Defense and Nuclear Technology Award of Excellence
- 2004: Lawrence Livermore National Laboratory (LLNL) Computation Award of Excellence
- 2003: Fellow of the American Physical Society
- 2001: US Department of Energy Award of Excellence
