= Georg Hohlneicher =

German solid state physicist (1937–2020)

Georg Hohlneicher (13 March 1937 in Munich – 10 March 2020 in Munich) was a German solid state physicist and professor at the University of Cologne.

== Education and career ==
Hohlneicher studied technical physics at the Technical University of Munich. He wrote his diploma thesis at the Institute for Physical Chemistry and Electrochemistry with Günter Scheibe. There he received his doctorate in 1962 with the title, Anwendung der erweiterten π-Elektronentheorie nach Hartmann-Ruch auf ungesättigte Kohlenwasserstoffe und Farbstoffe. Kritische Untersuchungen zur Mesomerieenergie.

In 1967, Hohlneicher habilitated at the Technical University of Munich for the subject of physical chemistry, with the title Zur theoretischen Interpretation der Elektronenspektren ungesättigter Verbindungen auf der Basis der Modelle von Pariser, Parr und Pople.

From 1972 to 1992, Hohlneicher held a chair in theoretical chemistry at the University of Cologne in the Institute for Organic Chemistry and in 1992 he moved to a chair in the Institute for Physical Chemistry. He also held the position of dean of the Faculty of Natural Sciences from 1978 to 1980. In 1988, together with Ehrhard Raschke, he organized a symposium on environmentally oriented risk assessment and on questions of risk acceptance in connection with the celebrations for the 600th anniversary of the founding of the University of Cologne. From 1993 to 1998 he was scientific director of the computer center of the university.

Hohlneicher married Hildegard Kindsmueller Hohlneicher in 1962 and had two daughters, Ursula and Barbara.

== Research ==
Hohlneicher's main research interests lie in (1) the determination of the geometry of molecules in different electronic states. Use of ab initio, semiempirical and DFT methods; (2) Theoretical studies of excited electronic states of medium-sized organic molecules. Spectra simulation on an ab-initio and semi-empirical level; (3) Quantum dynamic analysis of molecular systems.

== Bibliography ==
=== Books and chapters ===
- Hohlneicher, G.; Gildenpfennig, A. (2003), "Photoelectron Spectroscopy", Encyclopedia of Physical Science and Technology, Elsevier, pp. 57–90, doi:10.1016/b0-12-227410-5/00568-8, ISBN 978-0-12-227410-7
- Hohlneicher, Georg; Raschke, Ehrhard; Bentrup, Hans-Hermann (1989). Leben ohne Risiko? 600 Jahre Kölner Universität, 1388–1988. Köln: Verlag TÜV Rheinland. ISBN 3-88585-674-3. OCLC 22908627.

=== Selected papers ===
- Dick, Bernhard; Hohlneicher, Georg (1982-06-15). "Importance of initial and final states as intermediate states in two-photon spectroscopy of polar molecules". The Journal of Chemical Physics. 76 (12): 5755–5760. Bibcode:1982JChPh..76.5755D. doi:10.1063/1.442971. ISSN 0021-9606.
- Hohlneicher, Georg; Dick, Bernhard (1984). "Experimental determination of the low-lying excited a states of trans-stilbene". Journal of Photochemistry. 27 (2): 215–231. doi:10.1016/0047-2670(84)85039-x. ISSN 0047-2670.
- Waluk, Jacek; Muller, Monika; Swiderek, Petra; Kocher, Matthias; Vogel, Emanuel; Hohlneicher, Georg; Michl, Josef (1991). "Electronic states of porphycenes". Journal of the American Chemical Society. 113 (15): 5511–5527. Bibcode:1991JAChS.113.5511W. doi:10.1021/ja00015a002. ISSN 0002-7863.
- Cyrański, Michał K.; Schleyer, Paul von Ragué; Krygowski, Tadeusz M.; Jiao, Haijun; Hohlneicher, Georg (2003). "Facts and artifacts about aromatic stability estimation". Tetrahedron. 59 (10): 1657–1665. doi:10.1016/S0040-4020(03)00137-6.
